Hoodoo is a set of spiritual practices, traditions, and beliefs that were created by enslaved Africans in the Southern United States from various traditional African spiritualities, Christianity and elements of indigenous botanical knowledge. Practitioners of Hoodoo are called rootworkers, conjure doctors, conjure man or conjure woman, root doctors, Hoodoo doctors, and swampers. Regional synonyms for Hoodoo include conjure or rootwork. As a syncretic spiritual system, it also incorporates Islam brought over by enslaved West African Muslims and Spiritualism.

Many Hoodoo traditions draw from the beliefs of the Bakongo people of Central Africa. Over the first century of the trans-Atlantic slave trade, an estimated 52% of all kidnapped Africans (over 900,000 people) came from Central African countries like Cameroon, Congo, Angola, Central African Republic and Gabon. By the end of the colonial period, enslaved Africans were taken from Angola (40 percent), Senegambia (19.5 percent), the Windward Coast (16.3 percent), and the Gold Coast (13.3 percent), as well as the Bight of Benin and Bight of Biafra in smaller percentages. Following the Great Migration of African-Americans, Hoodoo spread throughout the United States.

Etymology
The first documentation of the word Hoodoo in the English language appeared in 1870. Its origins are obscure but it's believed to originate as an alteration of the word voodoo – a word that has its origin in the Gbe languages such as Ewe language, Adja language and Fon languages of Ghana Togo and Benin – referring to divinity. The Akan word odu meaning medicine is also considered to be a possible etymological origin. Another probable etymology is the Hausa word hu'du'ba which means resentment and retribution. The possible etymological origin of the word Hoodoo comes from the word Hudu which comes from the Ewe language spoken in the West African countries of Ghana,Togo and Benin. The word Hudu means spirit work. Hudu is also one of the dialects of the Ewe language of the Ewe people in West Africa. According to Paschal Berverly Randolph, the word Hoodoo is an African dialect. The origin of the word Hoodoo and other words associated with the practice were traced to the Bight of Benin and Senegambia. For example, in West Africa the word gris-gris (a conjure bag) is a Mande word. The word wanga (another word for mojo bag) comes from the Kikongo language. The Oxford English Dictionary cited the Sunday Appeal's definition of Hoodoo as an African dialect with practices similar to the mysteries of Obi (Obeah) in the Caribbean. In the Bahamas, Hoodoo is referred to as "obeah." According to author Zora Neale Hurston, "'Roots' is the Southern Negro's term for folk doctoring by herbs and prescriptions, and by extension, and because all hoodoo doctors cure by roots, it may be used as a synonym for hoodoo."

The word Hoodoo is sometimes spelled hoodoo. Recent scholarship publications spell the word with a capital letter. The word has different meanings depending on how it is spelled. Some authors spell Hoodoo with a capital letter to make a distinction from commercialized hoodoo which is spelled with a lowercase letter. Other authors have different reasons why they capitalize or lowercase the first letter.

History

Antebellum era

Hoodoo was created by African Americans, who were among over 12 million enslaved Africans from various ethnic groups being transported to the Americas from the 16th to 19th centuries (1514 to 1867) as part of the transatlantic slave trade. The transatlantic slave trade to the United States occurred between 1619 and 1808, and the illegal slave trade in the United States occurred between 1808 and 1860. Between 1619 and 1860 approximately 500,000 enslaved Africans were transported to the United States. From Central Africa, Hoodoo has Bakongo magical influence from the Bukongo religion incorporating the Kongo cosmogram, water spirits called Simbi, and some Nkisi and Minkisi practices. The West African influence is Vodun from the Fon and Ewe people in Benin and Togo following some elements from the Yoruba religion. After their contact with European slave traders and missionaries, some Africans converted to Christianity willingly, while other enslaved Africans were forced to become Christian which resulted in a syncretization of African spiritual practices and beliefs with the Christian faith. Enslaved and free Africans also learned some regional indigenous botanical knowledge after they arrived to the United States. The extent to which Hoodoo could be practiced varied by region and the temperament of the slave owners. For example, the Gullah people of the coastal Southeast experienced an isolation and relative freedom that allowed retention of various traditional West African cultural practices; whereas rootwork in the Mississippi Delta, where the concentration of enslaved African-Americans was dense, was practiced under a large cover of secrecy. The reason for secrecy among enslaved and free African Americans was that slave codes prohibited large gatherings of enslaved and free blacks. Slaveholders experienced how slave religion ignited slave revolts among enslaved and free blacks, and some leaders of slave insurrections were black ministers or conjure doctors. The Code Noir in French colonial Louisiana, prohibited and made it illegal for enslaved Africans to practice their traditional religions. Article III in the Code Noir states: "We forbid any public exercise of any religion other than Catholic." The Code Noir and other slave laws resulted in enslaved and free African Americans to conduct their spiritual practices in secluded areas such as woods (hush arbors), churches, and other places. Enslaved people created methods to decrease their noise when they practiced their spirituality. In a slave narrative from Arkansas, enslaved people prayed under pots to decrease their noise to prevent nearby whites from hearing them have church. A former slave in Arkansas named John Hunter said the slaves went to a secret house only they knew and turn the iron pots face up and their slaveholder could not hear them. Enslaved people also placed sticks under wash pots about a foot from the ground to decrease their noise as the sound they made during their rituals went into the pots.

Former slave and abolitionist William Wells Brown, wrote in his book, My southern home, or, The South and its people published in 1880, discussed the life of enslaved people in St. Louis, Missouri. Brown recorded a secret Voudoo ceremony at midnight in the city of St. Louis. Enslaved people circled around a cauldron, and a Voudoo queen had a magic wand, and snakes, lizards, frogs, and other animal parts were thrown into the cauldron. During the ceremony spirit possession took place. Brown also recorded other conjure (Hoodoo) practices among the enslaved population. Enslaved Africans in America held on to their African culture. Scholars assert that Christianity did not have much of an influence on some of the enslaved Africans as they continued to practice their traditional spiritual practices, and that Hoodoo was a form of resistance against slavery whereby enslaved Africans hid their traditions using the Christian religion against their slaveholders. This branch of Christianity among the enslaved was concealed from slaveholders in "invisible churches." Invisible churches were secret churches where enslaved African Americans combined Hoodoo with Christianity. Enslaved and free black ministers preached resistance to slavery and that the power of God through praise and worship and Hoodoo rituals will free enslaved people from bondage. William Edward Burghardt Du Bois (W. E. B. Du Bois) studied African American churches in the early twentieth century. Du Bois asserts that the early years of the Black church during slavery on plantations was influenced by Voodooism. Black church records in the late nineteenth century into the early twentieth century in the South, recorded a number of church members practiced conjure and combined Christian and African spiritual concepts to harm or heal members in their community.
Known Hoodoo spells date back to the era of slavery in the colonial history of the United States. A slave revolt broke out in 1712 in colonial New York, with enslaved Africans revolting and set fire to buildings in the downtown area. The leader of the revolt was a free African conjurer named Peter the Doctor who made a magical powder for the slaves to be rubbed on the body and clothes for their protection and empowerment. The Africans that revolted were Akan people from Ghana. Historians suggests the powder made by Peter the Doctor probably included some cemetery dirt to conjure the ancestors to provide spiritual militaristic support from ancestral spirits as help during the slave revolt. The Bakongo people in Central Africa incorporate cemetery dirt into minkisi conjuring bags to activate it with ancestral spirits, and during the slave trade Bakongo people were brought to colonial New York. The New York slave revolt of 1712 and others in the United States, showed a blending of West and Central African spiritual practices among enslaved and free blacks. Conjure bags, also called mojo bags, were used as a form of resistance against slavery. William Webb helped enslaved people on a plantation in Kentucky resist their oppressors with the use of mojo bags. Webb told the slaves to gather some roots and put them in bags and "march around the cabins several times and point the bags toward the master's house every morning." After the slaves did what they were instructed by Webb, the slaveholder treated his slaves better. Another enslaved African named Dinkie, known by the slaves as Dinkie King of Voudoos and the Goopher King, on a plantation in St. Louis, used goofer dust to resist a cruel overseer (a person who is an overseer of slaves). Dinkie was an enslaved man on a plantation who never worked like the other slaves. He was feared and respected by blacks and whites. Dinkie was known to carry a dried snakeskin, frog and lizard, and sprinkled goofer dust on himself and spoke to the spirit of the snake to wake up its spirit against the overseer.

Henry Clay Bruce who was a black abolitionist and writer, recorded his experience of enslaved people on a plantation in Virginia hired a conjurer to prevent slaveholders from selling them to plantations in the Deep South. Louis Hughes, an enslaved man who lived on plantations in Tennessee and Mississippi, had a mojo bag that he carried to prevent slaveholders from whipping him. The mojo bag Hughes carried on him was called a "voodoo bag," by the slaves in the area. Former slave and abolitionist Henry Bibb wrote in his autobiography Narrative of the Life and Adventures of Henry Bibb, An American Slave, Written by Himself that he sought the help of several conjurers when he was enslaved. Bibb went to the conjurers (Hoodoo doctors) and hoped the charms provided to him from the conjure doctors would prevent slaveholders from whipping and beating him. The conjurers provided Bibb with conjure powders to sprinkle around the bed of the slaveholder, put conjure powders in the slaveholder's shoes, and carry a bitter root and other charms on him for his protection against slaveholders.

In Alabama slave narratives, it was documented that former slaves used graveyard dirt to escape from slavery on the Underground Railroad. Freedom seekers rubbed graveyard dirt on the bottom of their feet or put graveyard dirt in their tracks to prevent slave catcher's dogs from tracking their scent. Former slave Ruby Tartt from Alabama, said there was a conjurer who could "Hoodoo the dogs." An enslaved conjurer could conjure confusion in the slave catcher's dogs which prevented whites from catching runaway slaves. In other narratives, enslaved people made a jack ball to know if a slave would be whipped or not. Enslaved people chewed and spit the juices of roots near their enslavers secretly to calm the emotions of the slaveholders which prevented whippings. Enslaved people relied on conjurers to prevent whippings and being sold further South.

A story from a former slave named Mary Middleton, a Gullah woman from the South Carolina Sea Islands, told of an incident of a slaveholder who was physically weakened from conjure. A slaveholder beat one his slaves badly. The slave he beat went to a conjurer and that conjurer made the slaveholder weak by sunset. Middleton said, "As soon as the sun was down, he was down too, he down yet. De witch done dat." Another slave story talked about an enslaved woman named Old Julie who was a conjure woman and was known among the slaves on the plantation to conjure death. Old Julie conjured so much death, her slaveholder sold her away to stop her from killing people on the plantation with conjure. Her enslaver put her on a steamboat to take her to her new slaveholder in the Deep South. According to the stories of freedmen after the Civil War, Old Julie used her conjure powers to turn the steamboat around back to where the boat was docked, which forced her slaveholder who tried to sell her away to keep her.

Frederick Douglass, who was a former slave, and an abolitionist and author, wrote in his autobiography that he sought spiritual assistance from an enslaved conjurer named Sandy Jenkins. Sandy told Douglass to follow him into the woods where they found a root that Sandy told Douglass to carry in his right pocket to prevent any white man from whipping him. Douglass carried the root on his right side instructed by Sandy and hoped the root would work when he returned to the plantation. The cruel slave-breaker Mr. Covey told Douglass to do some work, but as Mr. Covey approached Douglass, Douglass had the strength and courage to resist Mr. Covey and defeated him after they fought. Covey never bothered Douglass again. In his autobiography, Douglass believed the root given to him by Sandy prevented him from being whipped by Mr. Covey. Hoodoo or conjure for African Americans is a form of resistance against white supremacy. African American conjurers were seen as a threat by white Americans because enslaved people went to free and enslaved conjurers to receive charms for protection and revenge against their slaveholders. Enslaved blacks used Hoodoo to bring about justice on American plantations by poisoning slaveholders and conjuring death onto their oppressors.  

During the era of slavery, occultist Paschal Beverly Randolph began studying the occult and traveled and learned spiritual practices in Africa and Europe. Randolph was a mixed race free black man who wrote several books on the occult. In addition, Randolph was an abolitionist and spoke out against the practice of slavery in the South. After the American Civil War, Randolph educated freedmen in schools for former slaves called Freedmen's Bureau Schools in New Orleans, Louisiana, where he studied Louisiana Voodoo and hoodoo in African American communities, documenting his findings in his book, Seership, The Magnetic Mirror. In 1874, Randolph organized a spiritual organization called Brotherhood of Eulis in Tennessee. Through his travels, Randolph documented the continued African traditions in Hoodoo practiced by African Americans in the South. Randolph documented two African American men of Kongo origin that used Kongo conjure practices against each other. The two conjure men came from a slave ship that docked in Mobile Bay in 1860 or 1861. According to Randolph, the words "Hoodoo" and "Voodoo" are from African dialects, and the practices of Hoodoo and Voodoo are similar to Obi (Obeah) in the Caribbean. The Caribbean influence in hoodoo is evident in African American languages. For example, the word used to describe a rootworkers or Voodoo priest's pharmacy house (a house filled with herbs for herbal healing and conjure) is called an Obi hut or Obeah hut.

Post-emancipation

The mobility of Black people from the rural South to more urban areas in the North is characterized by the items used in Hoodoo. White pharmacists opened their shops in African American communities and began to offer items both asked for by their customers, as well as things they themselves felt would be of use. Examples of the adoption of occultism and mysticism may be seen in the colored wax candles in glass jars that are often labeled for specific purposes such as "Fast Luck" or "Love Drawing." There were some African Americans that sold hoodoo products in the black community. An African American woman, Mattie Sampson, worked as a sales person in an active mail order business selling hoodoo products to her neighbors in Georgia. Since the opening of Botanicas, Hoodoo practitioners purchase their spiritual supplies of novena candles, incense, herbs, conjure oils and other items from spiritual shops that service practitioners of Vodou, Santeria, and other African Traditional Religions.

Hoodoo spread throughout the United States as African-Americans left the delta during the Great Migration. As African Americans left the South during the Great Migration, they took the practice of Hoodoo to other black communities in the North. Benjamin Rucker, also known as Black Herman, provided Hoodoo services for African Americans in the North and the South when he traveled as a stage magician. Benjamin Rucker was born in Virginia in 1892. Rucker learned stage magic and conjure from an African American named Prince Herman (Alonzo Moore). After Prince Herman's death, Rucker changed his name in honor of his teacher to Black Herman. Black Herman traveled between the North and South and provided conjure services in black communities, such as card readings, crafting health tonics, and other services. However, Jim Crow laws pushed Black Herman to Harlem, New York's black community where he operated his own Hoodoo business and provided rootwork services to his clients. For some African Americans that practiced rootwork, providing conjure services in the black community for African Americans to obtain love, money, employment, and protection from the police was a way to help black people during the Jim Crow era in the United States so blacks can gain employment to support their families, and for their protection against the law. As black people traveled to northern areas, Hoodoo rituals were modified because there were not a lot of rural country areas to perform rituals in woods or near rivers. Therefore, African-Americans improvised their rituals inside their homes or secluded areas in the city. Herbs and roots needed were not gathered in nature but bought in spiritual shops. These spiritual shops near black neighborhoods sold botanicals and books used in modern Hoodoo.

The Sixth and Seventh Books of Moses is a grimoire that was made popular by European immigrants. Purportedly based on Jewish Kabbalah, it contains numerous signs, seals, and passages in Hebrew related to the prophet Moses' ability to work wonders. Though its authorship is attributed to Moses, the oldest manuscript dates to the mid-19th century.

However, the Sixth and Seventh Books of Moses is not traditional in hoodoo. White Americans marketed hoodoo to African Americans for their own personal profit which was not planned to maintain the African traditions in hoodoo. The incorporation of European grimoires into hoodoo began in the twentieth century during the Great Migration as African Americans left the South to live and work in Northern cities living near European immigrants. Nevertheless, the Sixth and Seventh Books of Moses has become a part of modern Hoodoo, because African Americans connected to the story of Moses freeing the Hebrews from slavery in Egypt, and Moses' magical powers against the Egyptians. Also, African Americans practiced Hoodoo centuries before the introduction of European grimoires. Hoodoo developed on slave plantations in the United States, and enslaved and free blacks used conjure as a form of resistance against slavery. Conjure practices in the slave community and among free blacks remained Central and West African in origin; such Hoodoo practices included the ring shout, dream divination, Bible conjure, spiritual use of herbs, conjure powders, conjure bags (mojo bags), and drawing Kongo cosmogram engravings (an X) on floors to protect themselves from a harsh slaveholder. For example, Gullah Jack was an African from Angola who brought a conjure bag onto a slave vessel leaving Zanzibar going to the United States for his spiritual protection against slavery. "Blacks utilized conjure as a form of resistance, revenge, and self-dense."

After the American Civil War into the present day with the Black Lives Matter movement, Hoodoo practices in the African American community also focus on spiritual protection from police brutality. Today, Hoodoo and other African Traditional Religions are present in the Black Lives Matter movement as one of many methods against police brutality and racism in the black community. Black American keynote speakers that are practitioners of Hoodoo spoke at an event at The Department of Arts and Humanities at California State University about the importance of Hoodoo and other African spiritual traditions practiced in social justice movements to liberate black people from oppression. African Americans in various African diaspora religions spiritually heal their communities by establishing healing centers that provide emotional and spiritual healing from police brutality. In addition, altars with white candles and offerings are placed in areas where an African American was murdered by police, and libation ceremonies and other spiritual practices are performed to heal the soul that died from racial violence. African-Americans also use Hoodoo to protect their properties from gentrification in their neighborhoods and on sites that are considered sacred to their communities. On Daufuskie Island, South Carolina in the early twentieth century, a Hoodoo practitioner Dr. Buzzard, placed a curse on a developing company that continued to build properties in Gullah cemeteries where Buzzard's ancestors are buried. According to locals, because of the curse the company and others following have never been able to build properties in the area and the owner of the company had a heart attack.

Black women practitioners of Hoodoo, Lucumi, Palo and other African-derived traditions are opening and owning spiritual stores online and in black neighborhoods to provide spiritual services to their community, and educate African descended people about Black spirituality on how to heal themselves physically and spiritually. The culture of Hoodoo inspired creations of art for some Black artists. In 2017, The Rootworker's Table is an art piece created by a black woman that shows the culture of Hoodoo portrayed as an altar with a collection of bottles underneath a chalk board with Hoodoo herbal knowledge with instructions. The artist grew up in the Hill District of Pittsburgh and saw practitioners of Hoodoo who were mostly black women. Black women played a role in their communities as midwives, healers, and conjure women for their clients.

Central African influence 

Cultural anthropologist Tony Kail conducted research in African-American communities in Memphis, Tennessee and traced the origins of Hoodoo practices to Central Africa. In Memphis, Kail  interviewed Black rootworkers and wrote about African American Hoodoo practices and history in his book "A Secret History of Memphis Hoodoo". For example, Kail recorded at former slave plantations in the American South, "The beliefs and practices of African traditional religions survived the Middle Passage (the Transatlantic slave trade) and were preserved among the many rootworkers and healers throughout the South. Many of them served as healers, counselors and pharmacists to slaves enduring the hardships of slavery." Sterling Stuckey was a professor of American history who specialized in the study of American slavery and African-American slave culture and history in the United States, asserted that African culture in America developed into a unique African-American spiritual and religious practice that was the foundation for conjure, black theology, and liberation movements. Stuckey provides examples in slave narratives, African-American quilts, Black churches, and the continued cultural practices of African Americans.

The Kongo Yowa cosmogram 
The Bantu-Kongo origins in Hoodoo practice are evident. According to academic research, about 40 percent of Africans shipped to the United States during the slave trade came from Central Africa's Kongo region. Emory University created an online database that shows the voyages of the trans-atlantic slave trade. This database shows many slave ships primarily leaving Central Africa. Ancient Kongolese spiritual beliefs and practices are present in Hoodoo such as the Kongo cosmogram. The basic form of the Kongo cosmogram is a simple cross (＋) with one line. The Kongo cosmogram symbolizes the rising of the sun in the east, the setting of the sun in the west, and represents cosmic energies. The horizontal line in the Kongo cosmogram represents the boundary between the physical world (realm of the living) and the spiritual world (realm of the ancestors). The vertical line of the cosmogram is the path of spiritual power from God at the top traveling to the realm of the dead below where the ancestors reside. The cosmogram, or dikenga, however, is not a unitary symbol like a Christian cross or a national flag. The physical world resides at the top of cosmogram and the spiritual (ancestral) world resides at the bottom of the cosmogram. At the horizonal line is a watery divide that separates the two worlds from the physical and spiritual, and thus the "element" of water has a role in African American spirituality. The Kongo cosmogram cross symbol has a physical form in Hoodoo called the crossroads where Hoodoo rituals are performed to communicate with spirits, and to leave ritual remains to remove a curse. The Kongo cosmogram is also spelled the Bakongo cosmogram and the "Yowa" cross.The crossroads is spiritual (a supernatural crossroads) that symbolizes communication between the worlds of the living and the world of the ancestors that is divided at the horizontal line. Counterclockwise sacred circle dances in Hoodoo are performed to communicate with ancestral spirits using the sign of the Yowa cross. Communication with the ancestors is a traditional practice in Hoodoo that was brought to the United States during the slave trade originating among Bantu-Kongo people. In Savannah, Georgia in a historic African American church called First African Baptist Church, the Kongo cosmogram symbol was found in the basement of the church. African Americans punctured holes in the basement floor of the church to make a diamond shaped Kongo cosmogram for prayer and meditation. The church was also a stop on the Underground Railroad. The holes in the floor provided breathable air for escaped enslaved people hiding in the basement of the church. The Kongo cosmogram sun cycle also influenced how African Americans in Georgia prayed. It was recorded that some African Americans in Georgia prayed at the rising and setting of the sun.

In an African American church in the Eastern Shore of Virginia, Kongo cosmograms were designed into the window frames of the church. The church was built facing an axis of an east–west direction so the sun rises directly over the church steeple in the east. The burial grounds of the church also show continued African American burial practices of placing mirror-like objects on top of graves.

In Kings County in Brooklyn, New York at the Lott Farmstead Kongo related artifacts were found on the site. The Kongo related artifacts were a Kongo cosmogram engraved onto ceramics and nkisi bundles that had cemetery dirt and iron nails left by enslaved African Americans. The iron nails researchers suggests were used to prevent whippings from slaveholders. Also, the Kongo cosmogram engravings were used as a crossroads for spiritual rituals by the enslaved African American population in Kings County. Historians suggests Lott Farmstead was a stop on the Underground Railroad for freedom seekers (runaway slaves). The Kongo cosmogram artifacts were used as a form of spiritual protection against slavery and for enslaved peoples protection during their escape from slavery on the Underground Railroad.

Archeologists also found the Kongo cosmogram on several plantations in the American South; they were Richmond Hill Plantation in Georgia, Frogmore Plantation in South Carolina, a plantation in Texas, and Magnolia Plantation in Louisiana. Historians call the locations where crossroad symbols were possibly found inside slave cabins and African-American living quarters as 'Crossroads Deposits.' Crossroads deposits were found underneath floor boards and in the northeast sections of cabins to conjure ancestral spirits for protection. Sacrificed animals and other charms were found where the crossroads symbols were drawn by enslaved African-Americans and four holes drilled into charms to symbolize the Bakongo cosmogram. Other West-Central African traditions found on plantations by historians is the use of six pointed stars as spiritual symbols. A six pointed star is a symbol in West Africa and in African-American spirituality.

On another plantation in Maryland archeologists unearthed artifacts that showed a blend of Central African and Christian spiritual practices among enslaved people. This was Ezekial's Wheel in the bible that blended with the Central African Kongo cosmogram. This may explain the connection enslaved Black Americans had with the Christian cross as it resembled their African symbol. The cosmogram represents the universe and how human souls travel in the spiritual realm after death entering into the ancestral realm and reincarnating back into the family. The artifacts uncovered at the James Brice House were Kongo cosmogram engravings drawn as crossroads (an X) inside the house. This was done to ward a place from a harsh slaveholder. Also, the Kongo cosmogram is evident in Hoodoo practice among Black Americans. Archeologists unearthed on a former slave plantation in South Carolina clay bowls made by enslaved Africans that had the Kongo cosmogram engraved onto the clay bowls. These clay bowls were used by African Americans for ritual purposes.

The Ring shout in Hoodoo has its origins from the Kongo region from the Kongo cosmogram (Yowa Cross) and ring shouters dance in a counterclockwise direction that follows the pattern of the rising of the sun in the east and the setting of the sun in the west. The ring shout follows the cyclical nature of life represented in the Kongo cosmogram of birth, life, death, and rebirth. Through counterclockwise circle dancing, ring shouters built up spiritual energy that resulted in the communication with ancestral spirits, and led to spirit possession by the Holy Spirit or ancestral spirits. Enslaved African Americans performed the counterclockwise circle dance until someone was pulled into the center of the ring by the spiritual vortex at the center. The spiritual vortex at the center of the ring shout was a sacred spiritual realm. The center of the ring shout is where the ancestors and the Holy Spirit reside at the center. The ring shout tradition continues in Georgia with the McIntosh County Shouters. At Cathead Creek in Georgia, archeologists found artifacts made by enslaved African Americans that linked to spiritual practices in West-Central Africa. Enslaved African Americans and their descendants after emancipation house spirits inside reflective materials and used reflective materials to transport the recently deceased to the spiritual realm. Broken glass on tombs reflects the other world. It is believed reflective materials are portals to the spirit world.

Other Kongo influences 
Water spirits, called Simbi, are also revered in Hoodoo which comes from Central African spiritual practices. When Africans were brought to the United States to be enslaved, they blended African spiritual beliefs with Christian baptismal practices. Enslaved Africans prayed to the spirit of the water and not to the Christian God when they baptized church members. Some African Americans prayed to Simbi water spirits during their baptismal services. In 1998, in a historic house in Annapolis, Maryland called the Brice House archaeologists unearthed Hoodoo artifacts inside the house that linked to the Kongo people. These artifacts are the continued practice of the Kongo's minkisi and nkisi culture in the United States brought over by enslaved Africans. For example, archeologists found artifacts used by enslaved African Americans to control spirits by housing spirits inside caches or nkisi bundles. These spirits inside objects were placed in secret locations to protect an area or bring harm to slaveholders. Nkisi bundles were found in other plantations in Virginia and Maryland. For example, nkisi bundles were found for the purpose of healing or misfortune. Archeologists found objects believed by the enslaved African American population in Virginia and Maryland to have spiritual power, such as coins, crystals, roots, fingernail clippings, crab claws, beads, iron, bones, and other items that were assembled together inside a bundle to conjure a specific result for either protection or healing. These items were hidden inside enslaved peoples dwellings. These practices were concealed from slaveholders.

In Darrow, Louisiana at the Ashland-Belle Helene Plantation historians and archeologists unearthed Kongo and Central African practices inside slave cabins. Enslaved Africans in Louisiana conjured the spirits of Kongo ancestors and water spirits by using sea shells. Other charms were found in several slave cabins, such as silver coins, beads, polished stones, bones, and were made into necklaces or worn in their pockets for protection. These artifacts provided examples of African rituals at Ashland Plantation. Slaveholders tried to stop African practices among their slaves, but enslaved African Americans disguised their rituals by using American materials and applying an African interpretation to them and hiding the charms in their pockets and making them into necklaces concealing these practices from their slaveholders.
In Talbot County, Maryland at the Wye House plantation where Frederick Douglass was enslaved in his youth, Kongo related artifacts were found. Enslaved African Americans created items to ward off evil spirits by creating a Hoodoo bundle near the entrances to chimneys which was believed to be where spirits enter. The Hoodoo bundle contained pieces of iron and a horse shoe. Enslaved African Americans put eyelets on shoes and boots to trap spirits. Archaeologists also found small carved wooden faces. The wooden carvings had two faces carved into them on both sides which were interpreted to mean an African American conjurer who was a two-headed doctor. Two-headed doctors in Hoodoo means a conjurer who can see into the future and has knowledge about spirits and things unknown.

At Levi Jordan Plantation in Brazoria, Texas near the Gulf Coast, researchers suggests the plantation owner Levi Jordan may have transported captive Africans from Cuba back to his plantation in Texas. These captive Africans practiced a Bantu-Kongo religion in Cuba, and researchers excavated Kongo related artifacts at the site. For example, archeologists found in one of the cabins called the "curer's cabin" remains of an nkisi nkondi with iron wedges driven into the figure to activate its spirit. Researchers found a Kongo bilongo which enslaved African Americans created using materials from white porcelain creating a doll figure. In the western section of the cabin they found iron kettles and iron chain fragments. Researchers suggests the western section of the cabin was an altar to the Kongo spirit Zarabanda.

Hoodoo and revolution 

In 1822, a free black named Denmark Vesey planned a slave revolt in Charleston, South Carolina that was modeled after the Haitian Revolution. "Denmark Vesey, a carpenter and formerly enslaved person, allegedly planned an enslaved insurrection to coincide with Bastille Day in Charleston in 1822. His plans called for his followers to execute the white enslavers, liberate the city of Charleston, and then sail to Haiti before the white power structure could retaliate." Denmark Vesey's co-conspirator was an enslaved Gullah conjurer named Gullah Jack, who was born in Angola and maintained his Central African spiritual practices. Gullah Jack was known to carry a mojo bag with him at all times for his spiritual protection. For the slaves spiritual protection, Gullah Jack gave them rootwork instructions for a possible slave revolt planned by his co-conspirator Denmark Vesey. Gullah Jack instructed the enslaved to eat a peanut butter-like mash, eat parched corn meal, and carry crab claws for their protection. The plan was to free those enslaved through armed resistance and the use of conjure. Denmark Vesey and Gullah Jack were not successful because their plan was revealed and stopped. From other historical research and records, Gullah Jack performed a ceremony and made the enslaved eat a half-cooked fowl. One of the slaves said that he could not talk about the conspiracy as Jack bound his speech with conjure. According to records, Jack "charmed" enslaved men to join the revolt. Gullah Jack used the spiritual knowledge he had with him from Angola and made protective charms for other enslaved people for their spiritual protection.

Magical amulets 
The word "goofer" in goofer dust has Kongo origins, it comes from the Kongo word 'Kufwa' which means to die." The mojo bag in Hoodoo has Bantu-Kongo origins. Mojo bags are called "toby" and the word toby derives from the Kongo word tobe. The word mojo also originated from the Kikongo word mooyo. The word mooyo means that natural ingredients have their own indwelling spirit that can be utilized in mojo bags to bring luck and protection. The mojo bag or conjure bag derived from the Bantu-Kongo minkisi. The nkisi singular, and minkisi plural, is when a spirit or spirits inhabit an object created by hand from an individual. These objects can be a bag (mojo bag or conjure bag) gourds, shells, and other containers. Various items are placed inside a bag to give it a particular spirit or job to do. Mojo bags and minkisis are filled with graveyard dirt, herbs, roots, and other materials by the Nganga spiritual healer. The spiritual priests in Central Africa became the rootworkers and Hoodoo doctors in African American communities. In the American South, conjure doctors create mojo bags similar to the Ngangas minkisi bags as both are fed offerings with whiskey. Other Bantu-Kongo origins in Hoodoo is making a cross mark (Kongo cosmogram) and stand on it and take an oath. This practice is done in Central Africa and in the United States in African American communities. The Kongo cosmogram is also used as a powerful charm of protection when drawn on the ground, the solar emblems or circles at the end and the arrows are not drawn just the cross marks which looks like an X.Other Bantu-Kongo practices present in Hoodoo are the use of conjure canes. Conjure canes in the United States are decorated with specific objects to conjure specific results and conjure spirits. This practice was brought to the United States during the transatlantic slave trade from Central Africa. Several conjure canes are used today in some African American families. In Central Africa among the Bantu-Kongo, banganga ritual healers use ritual staffs. These ritual staffs are called conjure canes in Hoodoo which conjure spirits and heal people. The banganga healers in Central Africa became the conjure doctors and herbal healers in African American communities in the United States. The Harn Museum of Art at the University of Florida collaborated with other world museums to compare African American conjure canes with ritual staffs from Central Africa and found similarities between the two, and other aspects of African American culture that originated from Bantu-Kongo people.

Bakongo spiritual protections influenced African American yard decorations. In Central Africa, Bantu-Kongo people decorated their yards and entrances to doorways with baskets and broken shiny items to protect from evil spirits and thieves. This practice is the origin of the bottle tree in Hoodoo. Throughout the American South in African American neighborhoods, there are some houses that have bottle trees and baskets placed at entrances to doorways for spiritual protection against conjure and evil spirits. In addition, nkisi culture influenced jar container magic. An African American man in North Carolina buried a jar under the steps with water and string in it for protection. If someone conjured him the string would turn into a snake. The man interviewed called it inkabera.

On Locust Grove plantation in Jefferson County, Kentucky, archeologists and historians found amulets made by enslaved African Americans that had the Kongo cosmogram engraved onto coins and beads. Blue beads were found among the artifacts, and in African spirituality blue beads attract protection to the wearer. In slave cabins in Kentucky and on other plantations in the American South, archeologists found blue beads and were used by enslaved people for spiritual protection. Enslaved African Americans in Kentucky combined Christian practices with traditional African beliefs.

Other Kongo influences at Congo Square were documented by Folklorist Puckett. African Americans poured libations at the four corners of Congo Square at midnight during a dark moon for a Hoodoo ritual. 

Historians from Southern Illinois University in the Africana Studies Department documented about 20 title words from the Kikongo language are in the Gullah language. These title words indicate continued African traditions in Hoodoo and conjure. The title words are spiritual in meaning. In Central Africa, spiritual priests and spiritual healers are called Nganga. In the South Carolina Lowcountry among Gullah people a male conjurer is called Nganga. Some Kikongo words have a "N" or "M" in the beginning of the word. However, when Bantu-Kongo people were enslaved in South Carolina the letters N and M were dropped from some of the title names. For example, in Central Africa the word to refer to spiritual mothers is Mama Mbondo. In the South Carolina Lowcountry in African American communities the word for a spiritual mother is Mama Bondo. In addition during slavery, it was documented there was a Kikongo speaking slave community in Charleston, South Carolina.

Dr. Robert Farris Thompson was a professor at Yale University and conducted academic research in Africa and the United States and traced Hoodoo's (African American conjure) origins to Central Africa's Bantu-Kongo people in his book Flash of the Spirit: African & Afro-American Art & Philosophy. Thompson was an African Art historian and found through his study of African Art the origins of African Americans' spiritual practices to certain regions in Africa. Former academic historian Albert J. Raboteau in his book, Slave Religion: The "Invisible Institution" in the Antebellum South, traced the origins of Hoodoo (conjure, rootwork) practices in the United States to West and Central Africa. These origins developed a slave culture in the United States that was social, spiritual, and religious. Professor Eddie Glaude at Princeton University defines Hoodoo as part of African-American religious life with practices influenced from Africa that fused with Christianity creating an African-American religious culture for liberation.

West African influence

Islam 
A major West African influence in Hoodoo is Islam. As a result of the transatlantic slave trade, some West African Muslims that practiced Islam were enslaved in the United States. Prior to their arrival to the American South, West African Muslims blended Islamic beliefs with traditional West African spiritual practices. On plantations in the American South enslaved West African Muslims kept some of their traditional Islamic culture. They practiced the Islamic prayers, wore turbans, and the men wore the traditional wide leg pants. Some enslaved West African Muslims practiced Hoodoo. Instead of using Christian prayers in the creation of charms, Islamic prayers were used. Enslaved black Muslim conjure doctors' Islamic attire was different from the other slaves, which made them easy to identify and ask for conjure services regarding protection from slaveholders. The Mandingo (Mandinka) were the first Muslim ethnic group imported from Sierra Leone in West Africa to the Americas. Mandingo people were known for their powerful conjure bags called gris-gris (later called mojo bags in the United States). The Bambara people an ethnic group of the Mandinka people influenced the making of charm bags and amulets. Words in Hoodoo in reference to charm bags come from the Bambara language. For example, the word zinzin spoken in Louisiana Creole means a power amulet. The Mande word marabout in Louisiana means a spiritual teacher. During the slave trade, some Mandingo people were able to carry their gris-gris bags with them when they boarded slave ships heading to the Americas bringing the practice to the United States. Enslaved people went to enslaved black Muslims for conjure services requesting them to make gris-gris bags (mojo bags) for protection against slavery.

West African Vodun 
Hoodoo also has some Vodun influence. For example, a primary ingredient used in goofer dust is snakeskins. Snakes (serpents) are revered in West African spiritual practices, because they represent divinity. The West African Vodun water spirit Mami Wata holds a snake in one hand. This reverence for snakes came to the United States during the slave trade, and in Hoodoo snakeskins are used in the preparation of conjure powders. Puckett explained that the origin of snake reverence in Hoodoo originates from snake (serpent) honoring in West Africa's Vodun tradition. It was documented from a former slave in Missouri that conjurers took dried snakes and frogs and ground them into powders to "Hoodoo people." A conjurer made a powder from a dried snake and a frog and put it in a jar and buried it under the steps of the target's house to "Hoodoo the person." When the targeted individual walked over the jar they had pain in their legs. Snakes in Hoodoo are used for healing, protection, and to curse people.

Yoruba influences 
It is often believed that there Yoruba origins in Hoodoo. Some archeologists and historians have misinterpreted the Yoruba trickster deity called Eshu-Elegbawho resides at the crossroads, and the Yoruba people leave offerings for Eshu-Elegba at the crossroads with The Man at the Crossroads in the Hoodoo tradition. The belief of an entity that lords over the crossroads is present in not only African Diasporic Traditions, but in Indigenous Traditions around the world. The crossroads has spiritual power in Hoodoo, and rituals are performed at the crossroads, and there is a spirit that resides at the crossroads to leave offerings for. However, the spirit that resides at the crossroads in Hoodoo is not named Eshu-Elegba because majority of the West and Central African influence of Hoodoo is not Yoruba, but BaKongo, Igbo, Mande, and more.  Folklorist Newbell Niles Puckett, recorded a number of crossroads rituals in Hoodoo practiced among African-Americans in the South and explained its meaning. Puckett wrote..."Possibly this custom of sacrificing at the crossroads is due to the idea that spirits, like men, travel the highways and would be more likely to hit upon the offering at the crossroads than elsewhere." In addition to leaving offerings and performing rituals at the crossroads, sometimes spiritual work or "spells" are left at the crossroads to remove unwanted energies.

In Annapolis, Maryland, archeologists uncovered evidence for West African and Central African practices. A Hoodoo spiritual bundle that contained nails, a stone axe and other items was found embedded four feet in the streets of Maryland near the capital. The axe inside the Hoodoo bundle showed what archeologists believes cultural link to the Yoruba people's deity Shango. Shango was (and is) a feared Orisha in Yorubaland, because he is associated with lightning and thunder, and this fear and respect towards thunder and lightning survived in African American communities. Folklorist Puckett wrote..."and thunder denotes an angry creator." Puckett recorded a number of beliefs surrounding the fear and respect for thunder and lightning in the African American community. In Hoodoo objects struck by lightning hold great power. However, the name Shango and other African deity names were lost during slavery. Therefore, the name Shango does not exist in Hoodoo, but just the name the thunder god. Enslaved and free blacks in New York were known among the whites in the area to take an oath to thunder and lightning. During the 1741 slave conspiracy in New York, African American men took an oath to thunder and lightning. However, generational Hoodoo practitioners in the Chesapeake region have pushed back on the misinterpretation of that finding, and know the crossroads artifact to invoke what would later be known as The Man at the Crossroads. As entities shifted , reformed, and were reborn and married with North American land to emerge new deities. 

Other Yoruba influences in Hoodoo is the use of iron. In West Africa, blacksmiths are respected because they are connected to the spirit of metal (iron). Among the Yoruba, the Orisha spirit Ogun corresponds to iron, and Ogun is called the "god of iron." West African people enslaved in the United States kept the respect for enslaved blacksmiths on the plantation, and recognition for iron. Horseshoes are made from metal and are used for protection in Hoodoo. In Maryland archeologists unearthed at the Wye House artifacts that linked to the Yoruba people's spiritual belief and practice in the reverence of Ogun, which is why African-Americans incorporate horseshoes and metal tools in Hoodoo because there is a spirit that corresponds to metal that can be invoked for protection from physical and spiritual harm. Yoruba cultural influences survived in Hoodoo, but the names and symbols of Orisha spirits are not present in Hoodoo because that information was lost during slavery; therefore just the natural elements that corresponds to each Orisha remain.

In addition, at the Kingsmill Plantation in Williamsburg, Virginia, enslaved blacksmiths created spoons that historians suggest have West African symbols carved onto them that have a spiritual cosmological meaning. In Alexandria, Virginia historians found in a slave cabin a wrought-iron figure made by an enslaved blacksmith in the eighteenth century which looked similar to Ogun statues made by blacksmiths in West Africa by the Edo, Fon, Mande and Yoruba people. West African blacksmiths enslaved in the United States were highly respected and feared by enslaved blacks because they had the ability to forge weapons. Gabriel Prosser was an African American enslaved in Richmond, Virginia and was a blacksmith. In 1800, Gabriel Prosser planned a slave revolt in Virginia. Historians assert that Prosser became the leader of the planned rebellion because he was a blacksmith, and enslaved people respected and feared blacksmiths because of their ability to forge weapons and their connection to the spirit of iron. Prosser and other enslaved blacksmiths made weapons for the rebellion, but the revolt never happened because two slaves informed the authorities.

Magical amulets 

At Stagville Plantation located in Durham County, North Carolina archeologists found artifacts made by enslaved African Americans that linked to spiritual practices found in West Africa. The artifacts found was a divining stick, walking stick, and cowrie shells. Stagville Plantation was owned by a wealthy slaveholding family called the Bennehan family; they enslaved 900 African American people. Stagville was one of many large slave plantations in the American South. Inside the Bennehan house, a walking stick was found placed in between the walls to curse the Bennehan family. An enslaved person secretly placed a walking stick to put evil spirits on their enslavers, putting a curse on the family for enslaving them. The walking stick was carved into an image of a West African snake spirit (deity) called Damballa. In West-Central Africa and in African-American communities, only initiates trained in the secrets of the serpent and spirits were allowed to have a conjure stick. These sticks conjured illness and healing, and the spirit of a conjure stick can warn the conjurer of impending danger. Cowrie shells were found on the site and was used by enslaved African Americans to connect with the spiritual element of water "to ensure spiritual guidance over bodies of water." In West Africa, cowrie shells were used for money and corresponds to African water spirits.

Other African cultural survivals among the Gullah people is giving their children African names. Linguists noticed identical or similar sounding names in the Gullah Geechee Nation that can be traced to Sierra Leone, a country in West Africa. Some African Americans in South Carolina and Georgia continue to give their children African names. This is done for spiritual and cultural reasons. The spiritual reason is for their ancestors to provide their children spiritual power and spiritual protection. The cultural reason is so their children will know what region in Africa their ancestry is from.

The practice of carving snakes onto "conjure sticks" to remove curses, evil spirits, and bring healing was found in African American communities in the Sea Islands among the Gullah Geechee people. Snake reverence in African American Hoodoo originated from West African societies. Another practice in Hoodoo that has its origins from West Africa is to moistened conjure bags and luck balls with whiskey (rum). It is believed that conjure bags and luck balls have a spirit, and to keep its spirit alive conjurers feed them whisky once a week. The practice has its roots from the Guinea Coast of Africa. The practice of foot-track magic in Hoodoo has its origins from Ghana. A person's foot track is used to send someone away by mixing their foot track with herbs, roots, and insects, specific ingredients used in Hoodoo to send someone away, and grind into a powder and place the powder in a container and throw it into a flowing river that leaves town and in a few days the person will leave town. Among the Tshi people in Ghana, spirit possession is not limited to people, but objects inanimate and animate can become possessed by spirits. This same belief among blacks in the South was documented by folklorist Puckett.

Symbolism in African American Quilting 

Both Central and West African symbolism has been observed in African American quilt-making. African American women made quilts incorporating the Bakongo cosmogram and West African crosses. For example, an African American woman named Harriet Powers made quilts using Bakongo and other West African symbols. On one of Harriet Powers quilts was a cross with four suns showing Bakongo influence quilting the Kongo cosmogram onto her quilts. Other African symbols were seen in Powers quilts. However, scholars suggests Harriet Powers cross symbols may also be a West African cross, as West Africans also had crosses as symbols, but the meaning and use of crosses in West Africa was different from the Bakongo people in Central Africa. Fon influence and artistic style was seen in Powers quilts as well. Harriet Powers was born enslaved in Georgia in 1837, and scholars suggest Powers may have been of Bakongo or Dahomean descent. African-American quilts are influenced by American quilt making and West African designs. Adinkra symbols and other African symbols are sewed into fabrics for spiritual purposes. Quilt makers in the African American community also sewed mojo bags and placed roots, bones, and other items inside bags for protection. Another example, was Louiza Francis Combs. Louiza Francis Combs was born in Guinea and came to the United States in the 1860s. Her quilts incorporate West African features of "a red striped pattern, patchwork, and two broad asymmetrical panels." This pattern design is similar to the Mande peoples religious concepts that evil spirits travel in a straight path, and to protect ones self from evil spirits broken lines and fragmented shapes are sewn into fabrics and quilts. Some of the meanings of the African symbols sewed into quilts were held secret. Scholars suggests some of the African American women who made quilts might have been in a secret society that retained the true spiritual meanings of the symbols seen in their quilts. Only initiates trained in quilt making received the spiritual meanings of the African symbols. Some of the symbols mention the crossroads, the Kongo cosmogram, and the ancestors. Certain colors are used in quilts to protect from evil and invoke ancestral spirits. Scholars interviewed an African American quilt maker in Oregon and have found Yoruba inspirations in her quilts. Her quilts looked similar to the Egungun regalia patterns of the Yoruba people in West Africa, where she incorporated "striped-piecing techniques that pay tribute to her ancestors."

Rootwork and healing 

African Americans had their own herbal knowledge that was brought from West and Central Africa to the United States. European slave traders selected certain West African ethnic groups for their knowledge of rice cultivation to be used in the United States on slave plantations. The region of Africa these ethnic groups were taken from for rice cultivation was called the "Rice Coast," made up of what is now Senegal, Sierra Leone, and Liberia. These areas were suitable for rice cultivation in Africa because of their moist semitropical environments, and European slave traders selected ethnic groups from these regions and enslaved them in the United States in the Sea Islands. During the transatlantic slave trade a variety of African plants were brought from Africa to the United States for cultivation, including okra, sorghum, yam, benneseed (sesame), watermelon, black-eyed peas, and kola nuts. "West African slaves brought not only herbal knowledge with them across the Atlantic; they also imported the actual seeds. Some wore necklaces of wild liquorice seeds as a protective amulet. Captains of slaving vessels used native roots to treat fevers that decimated their human cargo. The ships’ hellish holds were lined with straw that held the seeds of African grasses and other plants that took root in New World soil." African plants brought from Africa to North America were cultivated by enslaved African Americans for medicinal and spiritual use for the slave community, and cultivated for white American slaveholders for their economic gain. African Americans mixed their knowledge of herbs from Africa with European and regional Native American herbal knowledge. In Hoodoo, African Americans used herbs in different ways. For example, when it came to the medicinal use of herbs, African Americans learned some medicinal knowledge of herbs from Native Americans; however, the spiritual use of herbs and the practice of Hoodoo (conjuring) remained African in origin as enslaved African-Americans incorporated African religious rituals in the preparation of North American herbs and roots. Spiritual ritual preparations of herbs and roots were important to enslaved people as they believed combining ceremonies and prayers with medicinal preparations would imbue the medicines with spiritual power and invoke healing spirits that would make the herbal remedies more effective in healing. Enslaved African Americans also used their knowledge of herbs to poison their enslavers.

During slavery, some enslaved African Americans served as community doctors for Blacks and whites, despite many white Americans being cautious of black doctors because some enslaved Africans poisoned their masters. Enslaved Africans found herbal cures for animal poisons and diseases that helped both black and white Americans during slavery. For example, African traditional medicine proved beneficial during a smallpox outbreak in the colony of Boston, Massachusetts. An enslaved African named Onesimus was enslaved by Cotton Mather who was a minister in the colony. Boston was plagued by several smallpox outbreaks since the 1690s. Onesimus "introduced the practice of inoculation to colonial Boston" which helped reduce the spread of smallpox in the colony. Onesimus told Mather that when he was in Africa, Africans performed inoculations to reduce the spread of diseases in their societies. An enslaved man was given his freedom when he discovered a cure for a snake bite using herbal medicines.

Enslaved African Americans most often treated their own medical problems themselves using the herbal knowledge they brought with them from Africa, as well as some herbal knowledge learned from regional Native Americans. Many slaveholders lacked the knowledge to treat their slaves' medical conditions, while some simply did not care. Laws passed preventing enslaved African Americans from providing medical care for themselves further exacerbated this problem. Slaveholders passed preventative medical laws on their slaves because they feared enslaved people would poison them with their herbal knowledge. In 1748, Virginia passed a law to prevent African Americans from administering medicines, because white Americans feared African American folk practitioners would poison them with their herbal knowledge. However, some white Americans in Virginia continued to rely on African American herbal doctors because their cures were better than the white doctors'. Enslaved Jane Minor was emancipated because of her medical expertise during an 1825 fever epidemic in Virginia and eventually ran her own hospital, using her earnings to free at least 16 slaves. In addition, in 1749 in South Carolina the General Assembly passed a law prohibiting slaves from practicing medicine or dispensing medication, punishable by death. Slaveholders feared a possible slave revolt and being poisoned by their slaves, so much so that white Americans refused to allow enslaved African Americans medical knowledge.  Many of the medicines used by white Americans were chemical, while African Americans used the natural herbs and roots and made them into teas.

In a 1911 autobiographical account, Reverend Irving E. Lowery, who was born enslaved in Sumter County, South Carolina in September 1850, recalled an incident where an enslaved woman named Mary on the Frierson plantation was believed to have died from conjure. A rumor circulated that an enslaved woman named Epsey from another plantation poisoned Mary because she was jealous of the attention Mary received from a man on another plantation whom Epsey was romantically interested in. According to Lowery's written account, it was rumored that Epsey received a poison from an enslaved conjurer and secretly administered it to Mary, who died six months later. Lowery wrote that many of the conjure practices of enslaved blacks in Sumter County were influenced by Vodun from West Africa.

Among enslaved people there was a spiritual belief to refuse to plow a field in a straight path. Some enslaved people believed in the West African Mande concept that evil spirits travel in a straight path, and to protect from evil spirits, enslaved African Americans refused to plow fields in a straight path to break lines for spiritual protection against malevolent spirits.

Enslaved African American women used their knowledge of herbs to induce miscarriages during pregnancy to prevent slaveholders from owning their children and to prevent their children being born into slavery. In the nineteenth-century, black women used herbs such as penny royal and senna to induce abortion. Enslaved African Americans only trusted their own doctors and not white doctors, because enslaved doctors cures were better than white doctors. African American enslaved and free learned the local flora, and knew what plants to use for treating illnesses. Enslaved herbal doctors were the primary doctors on slave plantations, and some of them also practiced conjure. Before and after the Civil War, African Americans adjusted to their environments and learned the local flora from Indigenous peoples, books, and their study of plants.
 Europeans also brought their own plants from Europe to the United States for herbal cures in America which African Americans incorporated European herbs into their herbal practice. Agricultural scientist George Washington Carver was called a root doctor (practitioners of Hoodoo who can treat illnesses with plants) by blacks because of his knowledge of using plants to heal the body. Dr. Jim Jordan was the son of former slaves born in North Carolina and learned Hoodoo and conjuring from his family and healed his clients using rootwork, and operated a conjure Hoodoo store and became a multi-millionaire. 

Zora Neale Hurston conducted research in African American communities and documented the herbal practices of Blacks. African American rootworkers sometimes served two roles, a herbal doctor or conjure doctor. African American herbal doctors used their knowledge of herbs to treat diseases, such as heart disease, arthritis, cold, flu, and other illnesses. African American conjure doctors performed apotropaic magic and used herbs to remove curses, evil spirits, and bring good-luck, and sometimes there were a few African American rootworkers that did both. Hurston documented a traditional Hoodoo herb gatherer called a swamper. This person gathers their herbs and roots from swamps (wetlands). Rather a Hoodoo practitioner is a swamper or not, collecting certain roots and herbs in nature requires a prayer before taking the root or herb, an offering to the spirit of the plants, and a ceremony. If there are snakes that guard herbs and roots the snakes should not be killed by the Hoodoo practitioner.

It was documented in an Ohio slave narrative that enslaved African Americans combined conjure with herbal healing. Spiritual charms imbued with power through prayer was combined with herbal teas to treat chronic illness. In South Carolina, enslaved people treated worms using gypsum weed. Rheumatism was treated by massaging eelskin onto affected areas or ingesting a decoction of oakbark or pokeberry tea. Some illnesses are caused by sorcery (conjure) and the only remedy is to reverse the curse back onto the person who conjured it or clear it with conjure. Traditional herbal healing remains a continued practice in the Gullah Geechee Nation. Gullah people gather roots from their backyards and gardens and make medicines to heal diseases and treat illnesses. In northeast Missouri, historians and anthropologists interviewed African Americans and found continued West African herbal traditions of using roots and herbs to treat illnesses. The knowledge of how to find herbs in nature and make them into teas and tonics continued in African American communities. The remedy most commonly used in black communities in northeast Missouri to ward and fight off catching a cold was carrying a small bag of Ferula assafoedita; the folk word is asfidity, a plant from the fennel family.

In other regions of the South, African Americans made asfeddity balls placed around a baby's neck to relieve pain. The inside of the beech tree bark was boiled in water to treat cold and pneumonia. Bay leaf was used by African Americans to attract money by placing a bay leaf next to a dollar bill inside a wallet or a purse and the person will always attract money. Coffee grounds are used to predict the future. To cause misfortune in a family's home, cayenne pepper is mixed with sulfur and crossing incense and sprinkled around the home of the target. To bring relief from corns and callouses baking soda, castor oil, and lard is made into a paste and wrapped around the affected area using a cloth. To cure cuts, African Americans place spider webs and turpentine on wounds. Devil shoestring placed in the pocket brings good luck, and will trip up the devil. It is believed that placing an egg in the hand of a murder victim when they are in their coffin will cause the murderer to surrender to the police in three days. Mustard seeds sprinkled around the bed before going to sleep will protect someone from a boo hag (a person who can astral travel and leave their body at will and attack people in their sleep) from draining their life force. To treat heart ailments nutmeg was ground into a powder and mixed with water and drunk once a week. To bring the body temperature down jimson weed was tied around the head and ears. To treat measles, pine leaves (mullen leaves) was boiled into a tea. To treat the common cold pine straw was made into a tea. Salt is used to prevent a troublesome person from returning to your home by throwing salt behind the person as they walked out the house and they would never return. To cleanse the soul and spirit salt baths are taken. To prevent evil spirits from entering the home sulfur was sprinkled around the outside of the house. The bark from a red oak tree was boiled into a tea to reduce a fever or chills. The term smelling meant someone had the ability to detect spirits by scent; smelling cinnamon, nutmeg and ginger meant spirits were present. To ease frequent coughs and colds liquid tar was added to hot water.

African American midwives were the primary care for pregnant Black women and nursing mothers during and after slavery. By the mid-twentieth century, licenses were required for all women to become a midwife. Prior to certification, segregation laws prevented black women from entering hospitals that provided medical care for white people. Also, many African Americans did not trust white medical doctors, because some were known to conduct medical experiments on Blacks. African American women midwives provided medical care for nursing and pregnant Black women in their communities by treating them with herbal medicines. In addition, many African American midwives practiced Hoodoo. Hoodoo and midwife practices were combined in African American communities. During childbirth, African American midwives spiritually protected the house because it is believed that evil spirits might harm a new born spirit being born into the world. Protective charms were placed inside and outside of the house, and Black midwives prayed for spiritual protection for the mother and new born baby. After the baby was born, the umbilical cord called the navel string by midwives and the afterbirth was burned or buried. Proper handling of the umbilical cord and placenta ensured the mother would have another child. If these items were not properly handled by the midwives it is believed the woman would not have any more children.

Cosmology

God
Since the 19th century there has been Christian influence in Hoodoo thought. African American Christian conjurers believe their powers to heal, hex, trick, and divine comes from God. This is particularly evident in relation to God's providence and his role in retributive justice. For example, though there are strong ideas of good versus evil, cursing someone to cause their death might not be considered a malignant act. One practitioner explained it as follows:"In hoodooism, anythin' da' chew do is de plan of God undastan', God have somepin to do wit evah' thin' you do if it's good or bad, He's got somepin to do wit it ... jis what's fo' you, you'll git it." A translation of this is, "In hoodooism, anything that you do is the plan of God, understand? God has something to do with everything that you do whether it's good or bad, he's got something to do with it... what is for you, will come to you." Several African spiritual traditions recognized a genderless supreme being who created the world, was neither good nor evil, and which did not concern itself with the affairs of mankind. Lesser spirits were invoked to gain aid for humanity's problems.

God as a conjurer
Not only is Yahweh's providence a factor in Hoodoo practice, but Hoodoo thought understands the deity as the archetypal Hoodoo doctor. From this perspective, biblical figures are often recast as Hoodoo doctors and the Bible becomes a source of spells and is, itself, used as a protective talisman. This can be understood as a syncretic adaptation for the religion. By blending the ideas laid out by the Christian Bible, the faith is made more acceptable. This combines the teachings of Christianity that Africans brought to America were given and the traditional beliefs they brought with them. This practice in Hoodoo of combining African traditional beliefs with the Christian faith is defined as Afro-Christianity. During slavery, free and enslaved black Hoodoo doctors identified as Christian, and some root workers were pastors. By identifying as Christian, African American conjurers were able to hide their Hoodoo practices in the Christian religion. The beginnings of the African American church has its roots in African traditions. When Africans were enslaved in America they brought their religious worldviews with them that was synchronized with Christianity. These African worldviews in Black churches are, a belief in a Supreme deity, ancestral spirits that can be petitioned through prayer for assistance in life, spirit possession, laying on of hands to heal, ecstatic forms of worship using drums with singing and clapping, and respecting and living in harmony with nature and the spirits of nature. For example, in Hoodoo the divine can be commanded to act through the use of mojo bags, prayers, spiritual works or "spells" and laying tricks. One does not have to wait on God, but can command the divine to act at will through the use of Hoodoo rituals. This is what makes African American Christianity in Hoodoo different from other forms of Christianity. By seeing God in this way, Hoodoo practices are preserved in and outside the Black church. Also, ghosts and haunts can be controlled in Hoodoo because they emanate from God. Rootworkers control spirits through the use of Hoodoo rituals by capturing spirits using the spiritual tools used in Hoodoo. The difference between Afro-Christianity and European American Christianity is that spirits can be controlled by using the herbal ingredients in nature, because the herbs and nature have a spirit, and if the spirits of nature and the divine can be influenced so can other spirits such as ghosts.

During the 1930s, some observers of African American Christianity (or Afro-Christianity) saw how church services of African Americans was similar to Voodoo ceremonies. The possession during a baptismal service at a black Spiritual church was no different from a possession in a Voodoo ceremony, as the body movements, babbling in sounds, eye rolls, and other body jerks were similar. However, in Black churches it is called touched by the Holy Spirit, in Voodoo ceremonies African spirits mount or possess participants, but the response of possession is the same.

The origins of Afro-Christianity began with Bantu-Kongo people in Central Africa. Prior to Bakongo people coming to the United States and enslaved on plantations, Bakongo (Bantu-Kongo) people were introduced to Christianity from European missionaries and some converted to the Christian faith. Bantu-Kongo people's sacred symbol is a cross called the Kongo cosmogram (+) that looks similar to the Christian Cross. A form of Kongo Christianity was created in Central Africa. Bantu-Kongo people combined Kongo spiritual beliefs with the Christian faith that were nature spirits and spirits of dead ancestors. The concepts of Kongo Christianity among the Bakongo people was brought to the United States during the transatlantic slave trade and developed into Afro-Christianity among African Americans that is seen in Hoodoo and in some Black churches. As a result, African-American Hoodoo and Afro-Christianity developed differently and was not influenced by European American Christianity as some African Americans continued to believe in the African concepts about the nature of spirits and the cosmos coming from the Kongo cosmogram.

A work published in 2013 on Hoodoo lays out a model of Hoodoo origins and development. Mojo Workin: The Old African American Hoodoo System by Katrina Hazzard-Donald discusses what the author calls: the ARC or African Religion Complex which was a collection of eight traits which all the enslaved Africans had in common and were somewhat familiar to all held in the agricultural slave labor camps known as plantations communities. Those traits included naturopathic medicine, ancestor reverence, counter clockwise sacred circle dancing, blood sacrifice, divination, supernatural source of malady, water immersion and spirit possession. These traits allowed Culturally diverse Africans to find common culturo-spiritual ground. According to the author, Hoodoo developed under the influence of that complex, the African divinities moved back into their natural forces, unlike in the Caribbean and Latin America where the divinities moved into Catholic saints.

Moses as a conjurer

Hoodoo practitioners often understand the biblical figure Moses in similar terms. Hurston developed this idea in her novel Moses, Man of the Mountain, in which she calls Moses, "the finest Hoodoo man in the world." Obvious parallels between Moses and intentional paranormal influence (such as magic) occur in the biblical accounts of his confrontation with Pharaoh. Moses conjures, or performs magic "miracles" such as turning his staff into a snake. However, his greatest feat of conjure was using his powers to help free the Hebrews from slavery. This emphasis on Moses-as-conjurer led to the introduction of the pseudonymous work the Sixth and Seventh Books of Moses into the corpus of Hoodoo reference literature. In the twentieth century, The Sixth and Seventh Books of Moses was cheaply printed and sold in spiritual shops near black neighborhoods and purchased by African-Americans.

Bible as a talisman

In Hoodoo, "All hold that the Bible is the great conjure book in the world." It has many functions for the practitioner, not the least of which is a source of spells. This is particularly evident given the importance of the book Secrets of the Psalms in hoodoo culture. This book provides instruction for using psalms for things such as safe travel, headache, and marital relations. The Bible, however, is not just a source of spiritual works but is itself a conjuring talisman. It can be taken "to the crossroads", carried for protection, or even left open at specific pages while facing specific directions. This informant provides an example of both uses:

Whenevah ah'm afraid of someone doin' me harm ah read the 37 Psalms an' co'se ah leaves the Bible open with the head of it turned to the east as many as three days.

Author, Theophus Harold Smith, explained in his book, Conjuring Culture: Biblical Formations in Black America, that the Bible's place is an important tool in Hoodoo for African Americans' spiritual and physical liberation. The bible was used in slave religion as a magical formula that provided information on how to use herbs in conjure and how to use the bible to conjure specific results and spirits to bring about change in the lives of people, which is a continued practice today. Root workers remove curses reading scriptures from the Bible. At the same time as root workers can remove a curse using the Bible, they can also place curses on people with the Bible.

Enslaved and free blacks used the Bible as a tool against slavery. Free and enslaved people that could read found the stories of the Hebrews in the Bible in Egypt similar to their situation in the United States as enslaved people. The Hebrews in the Old Testament were freed from slavery in Egypt under the leadership of Moses. Examples of enslaved and free blacks using the Bible as a tool for liberation were Denmark Vesey's slave revolt in South Carolina in 1822 and Nat Turner's insurrection in Virginia in 1831. Vesey and Turner were ministers, and utilized the Christian faith to galvanize enslaved people to resist slavery through armed resistance. In Denmark Vesey's slave revolt, Vesey's co-conspirator was an enslaved Gullah conjurer named Gullah Jack who gave the slaves rootwork instructions for their spiritual protection for a possible slave revolt. Gullah Jack and Denmark Vesey attended the same church in Charleston, South Carolina and that was how they knew each other. However, Nat Turner was known among the slaves to have dreams and visions that came true. In the Hoodoo tradition, dreams and visions comes from spirits, such as the ancestors or the Holy Spirit in the Christian faith. Relying on dreams and visions for inspiration and knowledge is an African practice blended with the Christian faith among enslaved and free African Americans. After Nat Turner's rebellion, laws were passed in Virginia to end the education of free and enslaved blacks, and only allow white ministers to be present at all church services for enslaved people. White ministers preached obedience to slavery, while enslaved and free black ministers preached resistance to slavery using the stories of the Hebrews and Moses in the Old Testament of the Bible. There was a blend of African spiritual practices in both slave revolts of Vesey and Turner. Vesey and Turner used the Bible, and conjure was used alongside the Bible.

Nat Turner's mother came from a slave ship from Africa. Research has not determined what part of Africa Nat Turner's mother is from. However, Turner's mother had a profound spiritual influence in his life. His mother taught him about African spirituality that was evident in his life as he used visions and celestial interpretation of planetary bodies to understand messages from spirit. Turner believed the eclipse of the sun was a message from God to start a slave rebellion. Academic research from Virginia records on the Nat Turner slave revolt suggests that an occult religious ritual anointed Turner's raid. These practices among the enslaved population created a Hoodoo Christian Church or "Hoodoonized" version of Christianity on slave plantations, where enslaved Africans escaped into the woods at night and practiced a blend of African spirituality with Christianity. Hoodoo countered European American Christianity as enslaved African Americans reinterpreted Christianity to fit their situation in America as enslaved people. For example, God was seen as powerful and his power can help free enslaved people. This created an "invisible institution" on slave plantations as enslaved Africans practiced the ring shout, spirit possession, and healing rituals to receive messages from spirit about freedom. These practices were done in secret away from slaveholders. This was done in the Hoodoo church among the enslaved. Nat Turner had visions and omens which he interpreted came from spirit, and that spirit told him to start a rebellion to free enslaved people through armed resistance. Turner combined African spirituality with Christianity.

Conjuring the spirit of High John

Mojo Workin: The Old African American Hoodoo System also discusses the "High John the Conqueror root" and myth as well as the "nature sack." In African American folk stories, High John the Conqueror was an African prince who was kidnapped from Africa and enslaved in the United States. He was a trickster, and used his wit and charm to deceive and outsmart his slaveholders. After the American Civil War, before High John the Conqueror returned to Africa, he told the newly freed slaves that if they ever needed his spirit for freedom his spirit would reside in a root they could use. According to some scholars, the origin of High John the Conqueror may have originated from African male deities such as Elegua who is a trickster spirit in West Africa. By the twentieth century, white drugstore owners began selling High John the Conqueror products with the image of a white King on their labels commercializing hoodoo. Zora Neal Hurston documented some history about High John the Conqueror from her discussions with African Americans in the South in her book, The Sanctified Church. Some African Americans believed High John the Conqueror freed the slaves, and that President Abraham Lincoln and the Civil War did not bring freedom for Blacks. According to one woman, Aunt Shady Anne Sutton interviewed by Hurston, she said: "These young Negroes reads they books and talk about the war freeing the Negroes, by Aye Lord! A heap sees, but a few knows. 'Course, the war was a lot of help, but how come the war took place? They think they knows, but they don't. John de Conqueror had done put it into the white folks to give us our freedom." Anne Sutton said High John de Conqueror taught Black people about freedom and to prepare for their freedom in an upcoming war. The High John the Conqueror root used by African Americans prevented whippings from slaveholders and provided freedom from chattel slavery. The root given to Frederick Douglass was a High John root that prevented Douglass from being whipped and beaten by a slave-breaker. Former slave Henry Bibb used the High John root to protect himself by chewing and spitting the root towards his enslaver.

Spirits

A spirit that torments the living is known as a Boo Hag. Spirits are conjured to cure or kill people, and predict the future. Spirits can also help people find things. One slave narrative from South Carolina mentioned a pastor who spoke to spirits to help him find some hidden money. This record from a slave narrative revealed how Hoodoo and the Black church was intertwined. Another slave narrative from Indiana mentioned a location that the African American population refused to enter because "it was haunted by the spirits of black people who were beaten to death." This location was so feared by the blacks in the area that they placed a fence around it. Wearing a silver dime worn around the ankle or neck can protect someone from evil spirits and conjure. Another method to protect from evil spirits was to carry a small bag filled with salt and charcoal. In Indiana, African-Americans sprinkled chamber lye on the front and back steps to prevent evil spirits from entering the home. Curses can come from malevolent spirits not conjured by a conjurer, and evil spirits are more active at night. Another spirit feared in Gullah culture is the plat eye. The play eye is a one-eyed ghost that can morph into various forms. It is conjured when a person buries the head of a murdered man inside a hole with treasure.

Communication with spirits and the dead (ancestors) is a continued practice in Hoodoo that originated from West and Central Africa. Nature spirits in Hoodoo called Simbi originates from the Kongo people and are associated with water and magic in Central Africa and in Hoodoo. Simbi singular, and Bisimbi plural, are African water spirits. This belief in water spirits was brought to the United States during the transatlantic slave trade and continues in the African American community in the practice of Hoodoo and Voodoo. The Bisimbi are water spirits that reside in gullies, streams, fresh water, and outdoor water features (fountains). Academic research on the Pooshee Plantation and Woodboo Plantation in South Carolina, showed a continued belief of African water spirits among enslaved African Americans. Both plantations are "now under the waters of Lake Moultrie."

The earliest known record of simbi spirits was recorded in the nineteenth century by Edmund Ruffin who was a wealthy slaveholder from Virginia, and traveled to South Carolina "to keep the slave economic system viable through agricultural reform." In Ruffin's records he spelled simbi, cymbee, because he did not know the original spelling of the word. In Ruffin's records, he recorded a few conversations he had with some of the enslaved people. One enslaved boy said he saw a cymbee spirit running around a fountain one night when he was trying to get a drink of water. Another enslaved man said he saw a cymbee spirit sitting on a plank when he was a boy before it glided into the water. The Simbi (cymbee) spirits can help with healing, fertility, and prosperity. Baptismal services are done by rivers to invoke the blessings of the Simbi spirits to bring healing, fertility, and prosperity to people. West Africans and African Americans wear white clothing to invoke the water spirits during water ceremonies. Simbi spirits reside in forests, mountains, and the water and are responsible for the life and growth of nature. These beings are feared and respected. Simbi spirits are the guardians of the lands and the people that reside there. If someone disrespected a simbi by destroying the simbi's natural habitat, that simbi could take their life by drowning them in water. To obtain the powers of the simbi spirits, Bakongo people in Central Africa and African Americans in the Georgia and South Carolina Lowcountry collect rocks and seashells and create minkisi bundles. The appearance of the simbi spirits are male or female. Some have long black hair and resemble mermaids, while others look like albinos. In African-American folklore there is a story about a girl named Sukey meeting a mermaid named Mama Jo. Mama Jo in the story helps and protects Sukey and financially supported her by giving her gold coins. This story comes from the belief in Simbi spirits in West-Central Africa that came to the United States during the trans-atlantic slave trade. In West-Central Africa, there are folk stories of people meeting mermaids.

It is believed one's soul returns to God after death, however their spirit may still remain on Earth. Spirits can interact with the world by providing good fortune or bringing bad deeds. Other spirits revered in Hoodoo are the ancestors. In Hoodoo, the ancestors are important spirits that intercede in people's lives. Ancestors can intercede in the lives of people by providing guidance and protection. The practice of ancestral veneration in Hoodoo originated from African practices. However, if ancestors are not venerated they can cause trouble in their families lives. Ancestors are venerated through prayers and offerings. In Hoodoo, ancestors can appear in people's dreams to provide information and guidance.

Parents who died suddenly or by accidental death are believed to return in spirit and visit their children. This causes spiritual harm on the child as the spirit of the parent might haunt their children. To prevent this from happening, small children and babies of the deceased parent are passed over the coffin of the deceased to prevent the spirit of the parent from returning to visit their children. Former slave Reverend Irving E. Lowrey recorded this practice in his slave narrative when he visited the funeral of Mary an enslaved woman who died from being poisoned, and her small infant was passed over her coffin so her spirit would not return and visit her baby which would haunt and scare the baby. Lowrey wrote in his narrative: "Mary's baby was taken to the graveyard by its grandmother, and before the corpse was deposited in the earth, the baby was passed from one person to another across the coffin. The slaves believed that if this was not done it would be impossible to raise the infant. The mother's spirit would come back for her baby and take it to herself. This belief is held by many of the descendants of these slaves, who practice the same thing at the present day." The practice of passing babies and small children over coffins to prevent the spirits of deceased parents from visiting their children continues in Gullah Geechee communities in the Sea Islands of South Carolina and Georgia.

To have a strong connection with the ancestors in Hoodoo, graveyard dirt is sometimes used. Graveyard dirt from the grave of an ancestor provides protection. Graveyard dirt taken from the grave of a person who is not an ancestor is used to harm an enemy or for protection. However, before taking graveyard dirt one must pay for it with three pennies or some other form of payment. Graveyard dirt is another primary ingredient used in goofer dust. Graveyard dirt is placed inside mojo bags (conjure bags) to carry a spirit or spirits with you, if they are an ancestor or other spirits. Dirt from graveyards provides a way to have connections to spirits of the dead. To calm the spirits of ancestors, African Americans leave the last objects used by their family members and lay them on top of their grave as way to acknowledge them and it has the last essence or spirit of the person before they died. The cemetery is seen as a final resting place for the dead and as a doorway to the realm of the spirits. In Hoodoo, the spirits of the dead can be petitioned or conjured to carry out certain tasks for the conjurer that are positive or negative. This practice of ancestral reverence, using graveyard dirt, working with spirits of the dead, and decorating graves of family members and giving food offerings to dead relatives so they will not haunt the family, originated from Central Africa's Kongo region that was brought to the United States during the transatlantic slave trade. Also, the West African practice of pouring libations continues in the practice of Hoodoo. Libations are given in Hoodoo as an offering to honor and acknowledge the ancestors.

Those in the west coast of Africa the Ewe -speaking natives make offerings such as food or drinks usually pouring palm wine and bananas beer over an ancestors graves. Church members are commonly known to be buried with their feeting facing east so they can rise in the last day towards the sun, whereas, sinners are buried the opposite way to not cause them harm from the light. Other known tale such as ghost not being able to cross the water is well-known. If a hoodoo doctor wanted to conjure a ghost across the water a mirror ceremony is held. Spirits who have died from sickness in bed can walk among the living any night besides Friday nights, those are reserved for those who have passed in the dark.

Those who have passed because of their capturers can get justice in the afterlife using Hoodoo. For example, "If a murder victim is buried in a sitting position, the murderer will be speedily brought to justice." The victim who is sitting in front of the throne can request justice to be done. Leaving an egg in a murdered victims hand can prevent those who took their life not to wander to far from the scene. The egg representing life of the murderer is being held by the victim.

Destiny

In West African religions, people are given a destiny from God. It is believed someone can alter parts of their destiny through rituals and conjure. The belief in destiny in Hoodoo has its roots in West African religions. A skilled conjurer can alter a person's destiny through divinities or evil forces. This means a conjurer can shorten someone's life by conjuring death onto them. A conjurer can protect a person's destiny from another conjurer who is trying to change it. To know a person's destiny divination is used. Divination is also used to know what rituals should be performed and what charms should be worn to either protect or alter a person's destiny.

Practices

"Seeking" process

In a process known as "seeking", a hoodoo practitioner will ask for salvation of a person's soul in order for a Gullah church to accept them. A spiritual leader will assist in the process and after believing the follower is ready they will announce it to the church. A ceremony will commence with much singing, and the practice of a ring shout. The word "shout" derived from the West African Muslim word saut, meaning "dancing or moving around the Kaaba." The ring shout in Black churches (African American churches) originates from African styles of dance. Counterclockwise circle dancing is practiced in West and Central Africa to invoke the spirits of the ancestors and for spirit possession. The ring shout and shouting looks similar to African spirit possession. In Hoodoo, African Americans perform the ring shout to become touched or possessed by the Holy Spirit and to communicate with the spirits of dead ancestors. African Americans replaced African spirits with the Christian God (Holy Spirit) during possession. In African American churches this is called "catching the spirit." African Americans use music, clapping, and singing during the ring shout and in modern-day shouting in Black churches to bring down the spirit. The singing during the ring shout has Christian meaning using biblical references. During slavery enslaved Africans were forced to become Christian which resulted in a blend of African and Christian spiritual practices that shaped Hoodoo. As a result, Hoodoo was and continues to be practiced in some Black churches in the United States. In the Gullah/Geechee Cultural Heritage Corridor area, praise houses are places where African Americans gather to have church and perform healing rituals and the ring shout. The ring shout in Hoodoo has its origins in the Kongo region of Africa with the Kongo cosmogram. During the ring shout African Americans shuffle their feet on the floor or ground without removing their feet from the floor in order to create static electricity from the earth to connect with the spiritual energy of the earth. By connecting with the spiritual energy of the earth they are also connecting with the spirit of the creator because God created the earth; this is bringing down the spirit. Also, this is done to connect with ancestral spirits. This practice includes singing and clapping. The spiritual energy intensifies until someone is pulled into the center of the ring shout by the spirit that was brought down. This is done to allow spirit to enter and govern the ring. Researchers noticed the African American ring shout look similar to counterclockwise circle dances in West Africa. In West Africa during a funeral, a counterclockwise circle dance is performed to send the soul to the ancestral realm (land of the dead), because energy and souls travel in a circle. This practice in West Africa continued in the Gullah Geechee Nation where African Americans perform a ring shout over a person's grave to send their soul to the ancestral realm. In addition, the ring shout is performed for other special occasions not associated with death. The ring shout continues today in Georgia with the McIntosh County Shouters. In 2016, Vice News went to St. Helena Island, South Carolina and interviewed African Americans in the Gullah Geechee Nation and recorded some of their spiritual traditions and cultural practices. Their recordings showed African cultural and spiritual practices that survived in the Gullah Nation in South Carolina. The video showed a ring shout, singing, and other traditions. In addition, African Americans in South Carolina are fighting to keep their traditions alive despite gentrification of some of their communities. In 2017, the Smithsonian Institution interviewed African Americans and recorded the ring shout tradition practiced in the Gullah Geechee Nation in Georgia. The songs sung during the ring shout and in shouting originated from their ancestors from Africa who replaced African songs and chants with Christian songs and biblical references.

Hoodoo initiations

This seeking process in Hoodoo accompanied with the ring shout is also an initiation into Hoodoo. African Americans in the Sea Islands (Gullah Geechee people) performed initiations of community members by combining West African initiation practices with Christian practices called "Seeking Jesus." Young people spent time in nature "seeking Jesus," and received guidance from Black religious leaders. The spiritual mothers of the African American community provided prophetic guidance to those "seeking." After their initiation, initiates were accepted into the religious black community. Zora Neale Hurston wrote about her initiation into Hoodoo in her book Mules and Men published in 1935. Hurston explained her initiation into Hoodoo included wrapped snakeskins around her body, and lying on a couch (sofa) for three days nude so she could have a vision and acceptance from the spirits. In addition to lying on a couch nude wrapped in snakeskins for her initiation, Hurston had to drink the blood of the Hoodoo doctors who initiated her from a wine glass cup. There are other ways people become a Hoodoo doctor. One is through a mentor under an apprenticeship or they were born into a family of practitioners. Initiations are not required to become a Hoodoo doctor or rootworker.

Burial traditions 

Archeologists in New York discovered continued West-Central African burial practices in a section of Lower Manhattan, New York City which is now the location of the African Burial Ground National Monument. Archeologists and historians noted about 15,000 Africans were buried in a section of Lower Manhattan that was named the "Negroes Burial Ground." Over 500 artifacts were excavated showing continued African traditions in New York City's African American community. Some of the artifacts came from West Africa. Only 419 Africans buried were exhumed, and from their discoveries archeologists and historians found African cultural retention in African Americans burial practices. At the site, 146 beads were found and nine within that number came from West Africa. The other beads were manufactured in Europe but were used by enslaved and free people for their burial practices incorporating an African spiritual interpretation to European beads. For example, many of the Africans buried including women, men, and children had beads, waist beads, and wristlets. Beads in African society bring protection, wealth, fertility, and health to the wearer. In West Africa, African women wear beads around their waist for beauty. At the African Burial Ground, archeologists found beads wrapped around the waist of the burial remains of enslaved African American women. Also, about 200 shells were found with African remains. Beads, shells, and iron bars are associated with the Yoruba deity Olokun a spirit that owns the sea. Shells are associated with water and help the soul transition in the afterlife, because seashells help the soul move from the realm of the living into the realm of the dead (ancestors) which is associated with water. Other artifacts found at the African Burial Ground were shiny objects and reflective materials. These were used by Africans to communicate with spirits, because shiny and reflective materials were able to capture the "flash of the spirit." Between 1626 and 1660s, the majority of Africans imported to colonial New York were from the Kongo Angolan region, because New York was colonized by the Dutch. Historians and archeologists found Kongo related artifacts at the African Burial Ground such as minkisi and Nkisi bundles buried with African remains. These Nkisi and minkisi bundles became the conjure bags in Hoodoo.

After 1679, the majority of Africans imported to colonial New York were from West Africa because colonial rule of New York shifted from the Dutch to the English in 1664. West Africans imported to the colony were Akan, Fon, Yoruba,  and other ethnic groups. These diverse African ethnic groups brought their traditional cultures with them and adorned their dead with adornments made from American materials but had an African design and meaning to them.  Archeologists found a Ghanaian burial practice that was a funerary clay pipe with a Ghanaian design called ebua was found with the remains of an African American woman. In addition, archeologists excavated conjure bags (mojo bags) at the site. The conjuring bundles had crystals, roots, beads, feathers, animal parts, and other items to communicate with spirits and for protection. Other artifacts found at the site that linked to West Africa researchers suggests was the finding of an Akan Sankofa Symbol found on a coffin. The Akan Sankofa Adinkra symbol means to remember ones ancestors, and look to the future while not forgetting the past. In addition, West African spiritual beliefs mixed with the Christian faith, and free and enslaved West Africans started their own African Methodist Episcopal Zion Churches in New York City. The African Burial Ground reserved a location called the Ancestral Libation Chamber for people to perform spiritual ceremonies to pay their respect for the enslaved and free Africans buried at the monument. African Americans and other African descended peoples continue to travel to the African Burial Ground from across the country and around the world and perform libation ceremonies to honor the 15,000 plus African people buried in New York City.

Bantu-Kongo burial practices by African Americans were found in Florida. Researchers noticed the similarities of grave sites of African Americans in Florida and those of the Bakongo people in Central Africa. Headstones with a T shape were seen in Black cemeteries and at grave sites in the Kongo region. The T shape headstone peculiar to black cemeteries in north Florida during the 1920s through the 1950s corresponds to the lower half of the Kongo cosmogram that symbolizes the realm of the ancestors and spiritual power. In Bantu-Kongo spirituality the spirit realm is in the color white. African Americans decorated the graves of their family members with white items such as white conch seashells representing the watery divide located on the horizontal line of the Kongo cosmogram that is a boundary between the realm of the living and the realm of the dead. By placing seashells on graves, African Americans were creating a boundary (barrier) between the recently deceased and them, keeping the spirit in the realm of the dead below the Kongo cosmogram. The practice of placing seashells on top of graves in African American cemeteries continued beyond the 1950s, and was found in Archer, Florida. Researchers found other continued Bakongo burial practices in black cemeteries in Florida. In the Kongo region, Bakongo people placed broken objects on top of graves so the recently deceased can travel to the land of the dead. The broken items symbolize the person's connection to the living was broken by their death, and they need to return to the realm of the dead. This practice was found in African American cemeteries in Florida and among the Gullah Geechee people in the Sea Islands in the United States. The conjure practices of African Americans in Georgia was influenced by Bakongo and other West African ethnic groups when a slave ship the Wanderer illegally imported 409 enslaved Africans to Jekyll Island, Georgia in 1858.

Bottle tree
Hoodoo is linked to a popular tradition of bottle trees in the United States. According to gardener and glass bottle researcher Felder Rushing, the use of bottle trees came to the Old South from Africa with the slave trade. The use of blue bottles is linked to the "haint blue" spirit specifically. Glass bottle trees have become a popular garden decoration throughout the South and Southwest. According to academic research, bottle trees originated in the Kongo region. The bottle tree practice has been found in the Kongo region in Central Africa, and in the Caribbean. African descended people in the African Diaspora decorated trees with bottles, plates, pieces of broken pots, and other items to drive away evil. This practice was brought to the United States during the transatlantic slave trade. The purpose of bottle trees is to protect a home or a location from evil spirits by trapping evil spirits inside the bottles. How bottle trees worked was that spirits would be attracted to the sunlight that is seen flickering inside the bottle as the sunlight passes through it trapping the spirit in the bottle and banishing the spirit with sunlight. Sometimes items such as  stones or graveyard dirt is placed inside the bottle to further attract the spirit to the bottle in order to trap it.

Personal concerns
In Hoodoo, personal concerns are used such as, hair, nail-clippings, blood, bones, and other bodily fluids are mixed with ingredients for either a positive or a negative effect. These items are placed inside conjure bags or jars and mixed with roots, herbs, animal parts, and graveyard dirt from a murdered victim's grave and sometimes ground into a powder. The cursed items are buried under a person's steps to cause misfortune. To prevent from being "fixed" (cursed) it is considered a good idea to burn loose hairs, combed or fallen from the head, so a conjurer cannot make a cursing powder from a person's hair. Placing personal concerns in containers and burying them to cause harm was found in West African countries of Nigeria and Benin.

Spirit mediation
The purpose of Hoodoo was to allow people access to supernatural forces to improve their lives. Hoodoo is purported to help people attain power or success ("luck") in many areas of life including money, love, health, and employment. As in many other spiritual and medical folk practices, extensive use is made of herbs, minerals, parts of animals' bodies, an individual's possessions, candles, colored candles, incense, and other spiritual tools are used in Hoodoo to bring healing, protection, love and luck. For example, to prevent separation of a husband and wife couples relied on rootwork and conjure. One example documented in a slave narrative was to take a rabbit's forefoot, a loadstone, take nine hairs from the top of the head, and place all ingredients in a red flannel bag and bury it under the steps at the front door. To protect from conjure, a hole was punched through a dime and a string was inserted inside the hole and the dime was tied to the left ankle. In Hoodoo, men who want to keep their wife faithful will take her slip or piece of her bra and for each night tie nine knots with it, and the man should wear this in his pocket which will prevent his wife from having an affair. Chickens are used in rootwork and conjure to find a "work" (spell) a conjurer buried in the ground to cause misfortune. In West-Central Africa and in the Gullah Geechee Nation in the South Carolina and Georgia Lowcountry, chickens are free to roam the property as they have a natural spiritual ability to locate cursed items buried in the ground.

How Hoodoo magic works is by working with the spirits of roots, herbs, insects, calling ancestors, and other spirits to activate the work for manifestation. Contact with ancestors or other spirits of the dead is an important practice within the conjure tradition, and the recitation of psalms from the Bible is also considered spiritually influential in Hoodoo. Due to Hoodoo's great emphasis on an individual's spiritual power to affect desired change in the course of events, Hoodoo's principles are believed to be accessible for use by any individual of faith.  Hoodoo practice does not require a formally designated minister.

Offerings
The West and Central African practice of leaving food offerings for deceased relatives and to feed the spirits either ancestors or petition other spirits that are not ancestors by giving them offerings of food, water, or rum (whiskey) continues in the practice of Hoodoo. Providing spirits offerings of libation empowers the spirits because it feeds them. Also it honors the spirits by acknowledging their existence. These offerings of food and liquids and the pouring of libations are left at gravesites or at a tree. This practice of offerings and libations is practiced in the Central African country of Gabon and other parts of Africa and was brought to the United States during the transatlantic slave trade.

Commonly Used in Hoodoo
Conjure can be made using many things or nothing at all. At times there are items commonly used in Hoodoo if need be. "Fast Luck" and "Red Fast Luck"  an herbal scrub is used to bring luck into stores or a persons life. "Essence of Van Van" and "Fast Scrubbing Essence" are mixtures of one to thirteen oils containing herbs such as cinnamon, wintergreen, lavender, and so forth. Colors are also important in Hoodoo to conjure different results the person is looking for. For example, "Red, for victory. Pink, for love (some say for drawing success). Green, to drive off (some say for success), Blue, for success and protection (for causing death also), Yellow. For money, Brown, for drawing money and people."

Divination 

Divination in Hoodoo originated from African practices. In West-Central Africa, divination was (and is) used to determine what an individual or a community should know that is important for survival and spiritual balance. In Africa and in Hoodoo, people turn to divination seeking guidance about major changes in their life from an elder or a skilled diviner. Conjure doctors diagnose illnesses and determine treatments using divination. This practice was brought to the United States during the transatlantic slave trade and was later influenced by other systems of divination. There are several forms of divination traditionally used in Hoodoo.

Astrology
Practitioners sometimes incorporate planetary and elemental energies in their spiritual work (spells). Rootworkers in Indiana trained under African-American astrologers in black communities. Numerology is also used in Hoodoo and combined with astrology for spiritual works. African-Americans in Indiana (in the 1980s into present day) combine numerology, astrology, African mysticism and Voodoo and Hoodoo creating a new spiritual divination practice and system of magic unique to African-Americans. For example, Nat Turner took the sign of an eclipse of the sun as a sign from God to start his slave revolt in Southampton County, Virginia in 1831.

Augury
The practice of Augury is deciphering phenomena (omens) that are believed to foretell the future, often signifying the advent of change. Before his rebellion, Nat Turner had visions and omens from spirit to free the enslaved through armed resistance. In African American communities a child born with a caul over their face is believed to have psychic gifts to see spirits and see into the future. This belief in the caul on a baby's face brings psychic gifts was found in West Africa in Benin (Dahomey). After the baby is born, the caul is taken off the baby's face and is preserved and used to drive away (or banish) ghosts. It is believed a child born at midnight will have second sight or extrasensory perception about events.

Cartomancy
Cartomancy is the practice of using Tarot and poker playing cards to receive messages from spirit. This form of divination was added later in Hoodoo. There are some Hoodoo practitioners that use both.

Cleromancy
Cleromancy is the practice of casting small objects such as shells, bones, stalks, coins, nuts, stones, dice, and sticks for an answer from spirit. The use of bones, sticks, shells and other items is a form of divination used in Africa and in Hoodoo in the United States.

Domino divination
Rootworkers also divine with dominoes.

Oneiromancy
Oneiromancy is a form of divination based upon dreams. Former slaves talked about receiving messages from ancestors and spirits about impending danger or advice about how to save money. Harriet Tubman believed her dreams were given to her from God on how to rescue her family from slavery on the Underground Railroad. Tubman told biographers she had dreams flying over fields which let her know where to go and where the safe places were to hide freedom seekers.

Walking boy
The walking boy was a traditional form of divination practiced by African Americans on slave plantations, and the practice continued after chattel slavery. A conjurer would take a bottle and tie a string to it and place a bug inside the bottle. The conjurer pulled the bottle as the bug moved. What ever direction the bug moved inside the bottle the conjurer knew where a spell bottle was buried that caused misfortune or where the person lived who buried the bottle.

Enslaved African-Americans held diviners in high respect because they had knowledge about events unknown. By using divination, enslaved conjurers knew if a slave would be whipped, sold or escape to freedom. Autobiographies of former slaves wrote about enslaved people seeking council from enslaved diviners.

Hoodoo and the Spiritual church movement
 
The Spiritual church movement in the United States began in the mid-nineteenth century. The African American community was a part of this movement beginning in the early twentieth century, and several Spiritual churches are in African American communities. African Americans started independent Spiritual churches as a way for them to hide their African practices from whites by synchronizing African traditions with the Christian faith. Some Black Spiritual churches incorporated elements of Hoodoo and Voodoo practices. There were some Spiritual churches documented by Zora Neale Hurston that incorporated Hoodoo practices. A Spiritual church in New Orleans called The Eternal Life Christian Spiritualist Church led by an African American woman, Mother Catherine Seals, performed Hoodoo to heal her clients. Mother Catherine Seals healed a church member sacrificing a chicken by slitting it live and tied it to a person's leg for two days. This is a continued African tradition of using chickens to heal and conjure protection. Other African Diaspora practices Mother Catherine Seals incorporated into her Spiritual church as noted by Zora Neale Hurston was Seals reverence to a Haitian Vodou snake loa spirit Damballa. A snake design was painted on a wall at Mother Seal's church. Another African American Spiritual church leader had a plastic snake on his altar. Snake reverence among African Americans in Voodoo and Hoodoo originates from West Africa. This Spiritual church had a branch in Memphis, Tennessee where African-Americans attended to practice Hoodoo secretly inside of the church. New Orleans and Memphis have several Spiritual churches where Hoodoo and Voudou is practiced. Rituals of healing, communing with ancestral spirits, worship services, shouting, eclectic belief systems, Hoodoo and Voudou elaborate rituals are taken place inside the churches.

Washington "Doc" Harris an African American from Memphis, Tennessee founded the Saint Paul Spiritual Holy Temple. The Spiritual church was nicknamed by the blacks in the area as "Voodoo Village." Although no actual Voodoo took place inside his Spiritual church; however, Hoodoo was practiced in the church. Doc Harris was known to make mojo bags that looked similar to the Kongo-based minkisi bundles, and he removed curses from people using Hoodoo. Doc Harris built his church in a secluded area in the black community so he and his family can practice their traditions in private. African Americans in Spiritual churches blended African spiritual traditions and African spirits with Christianity creating a uniquely African-American religion. African American Hoodoo religious and spiritual leaders in Spiritual churches did not refer to themselves as rootworkers or hoodoo doctors, but as "spiritual advisors," to avoid negative attention from their community and the local authorities. Hiding Hoodoo practices inside Black churches was necessary for African Americans because some people were lynched for practicing Hoodoo. In September 1901 the newspaper, the Chicago Tribune, reported two people were lynched for practicing hoodooism. Despite these circumstances, African American Spiritual churches provided food and other services for the black community.

Hoodoo and the Sanctified church 
 
Another spiritual institution African Americans hid their Hoodoo practices was in the Sanctified Church started in Memphis, Tennessee. Bishop Charles Harrison Mason and other African American ministers founded the Church of God in Christ in the early twentieth century which has a predominantly African American membership. Bishop Charles Harrison Mason was known among the members of his congregation to heal church members using roots, herbs and conjure oils. Bishop Mason and other Pentecostal pastors were rootworkers and used spiritual tools to remove demons and curses off church members. The removal of evil spirits from church members in Black Pentecostal churches involves prayer, playing Black gospel music, conjure oils and other Hoodoo tools. Author Zora Neal Hurston wrote in her book The Sanctified Church, the spiritual beliefs and conjure practices of the Black congregation in Sanctified Churches. African Americans talked about nailing a horse shoe over the door to ward off evil and making conjure balls to remove diseases. British historians traced the origins of the creation of conjure balls in Hoodoo to the West African practice of creating gris-gris charms and the Central African practice of creating minkisi containers. As white spiritual merchants exploited hoodoo and turned it into just tricks and spells, African Americans moved more of the traditional Hoodoo practices of animal sacrifice, incorporating animal parts in spiritual work, Holy Ghost shouting, the ring shout, and other practices were synchronized with Christianity which took the Hoodoo practiced by African Americans underground. Some Sanctified Churches in African American communities continue to incorporate Hoodoo. African American religious institutions are not just places of worship and spirituality, but are also places to discuss injustices in their communities and how to unite to bring about political and spiritual transformations for African Americans.

Hoodoo in the African American Faith movement 

Hoodoo functioned more as a tool of spiritual healing within Black Protestantism. African American pastors combined Pentecostalism, African-derived traditions of Hoodoo, Voodoo, conjure, and rootwork to heal church members of physical and spiritual ailments. Prosperity theology was taught to church members as they believed God wants his children to be prosperous, and prosperity came to those by having faith in God. For example, Reverend Ike preached prosperity to his congregation. African American faith movements is about having faith in Gods power through fasting, prayer, and sometimes using conjure. Some Black church members believed the power to heal, prophecy, conjure, and curse came from God, however, other church members believed the power to curse came from Satan and only God's power can remove a demonic curse. Deliverance ministry was preached by Black ministers to rage warfare against demons was also a part of Hoodoo culture in that by praying to God and ancestral spirits can remove demonic curses.

Hoodoo in literature

Zora Neale Hurston often employs Hoodoo imagery and references into her literature. In Sweat, the protagonist Delia is a washwoman with a fear of snakes. Her cruel husband, Sykes, is a devotee of Li Grande Zombi and uses her ophidiophobia against her to establish dominance. Delia learns Voodoo and Hoodoo and manages to hex Sykes. Another book by Zora Neale Hurston features Hoodoo hexes and spells as well as a Hoodoo doctor. Zora Neale Hurston's professional career was an anthropologist and a writer. Hurston documented African American folklore and spiritual practices in Black communities in the United States and the Caribbean. Hurston traveled to Eatonville, Florida and New Orleans, Louisiana and wrote about the spiritual practices of Blacks publishing her findings in books and articles providing readers knowledge of African American spirituality.

Charles Waddell Chesnutt was a mixed race African American author who wrote African-American folklore in his literature using fiction to reference the culture of Hoodoo is his writings. In 1899, Chesnutt published The Conjure Woman that tells the story of African Americans after the Civil War and how they used conjure to fix their everyday problems. In addition, Chesnutt does not portray the African American characters in the book as racially inferior to whites. The African Americans in the book use their wit and intelligence combining Hoodoo practices to solve their problems. The style of writing is phonetic. Chesnutt wrote the book how African Americans in the South spoke during his time. This allows readers an example of African American Vernacular and culture. Also, the book discusses the North's economic opportunist exploitation of the South during the Reconstruction Era and how African Americans navigated through this process in their communities.

Another writer who focused on African American spirituality in their literature is Ishmael Reed. Ishmael Reed criticizes the erasure of the African American from the American frontier narrative, as well as exposing the racist context of the American dream and the cultural evolution of the military-industrial complex. He explores the role of Hoodoo in the forging of a uniquely African-American culture. Reed writes about the Neo-hoo-doo aesthetic in aspects of African American culture such as dance, poetry and quilting. His book Mumbo Jumbo has many references to Hoodoo. Mumbo Jumbo has been considered as representing the relationship between the westernized African American narrative and the demands of the western literary canon, and the African tradition at the heart of Hoodoo that has defied assimilation. In his book Yellow Back Radio Broke-Down, the protagonist the Loop Garoo kid acts as an American frontier travelling with the Hoodoo church and cursing 'Drag Gibson' the monocultural white American landowner.

In Mama Day by Gloria Naylor, Mama day is a conjure woman with an encyclopedic knowledge of plants and the ability to contact her ancestors. The book focuses on benevolent aspects of Hoodoo as a means of elders helping the community and carrying on a tradition, with her saving Bernice's fertility. Sassafrass, Cypress & Indigo also explores the deep connection between community empowerment and Hoodoo, in the story, Indigo has healing abilities and makes Hoodoo dolls.

A professor from Swarthmore College studied the depictions of Hoodoo and Voodoo in comic books from 1931 to 1993. White comic book creators portrayed Black folk religions as evil showing demonic possessions in comic books. Blackfaced stereotypical images of African Americans were drawn in comics to vilify Black people and their folk religions. Black American comic book creators portrayed Hoodoo and Voodoo in their comics as tools against white supremacy. Black creators had story scenes in their comics of black superheroes using their Hoodoo conjure powers to save their people and defeat white supremacists. In 1973, Marvel Comics created a character called Brother Voodoo that stands and fights for justice using his conjure powers.

Toni Morrison makes references to African American spirituality in her literature. Morrison's novel, Song of Solomon published in 1977, tells the story of the character Milkman an African American in search of his African ancestors. Milkman lived in the North but returned to the South in search of his ancestry. By the end of the book Milkman learns he comes from a family of African medicine people and gained his ancestral powers and his soul flew back to Africa after he died. Morrison's idea of Milkman flying back to Africa was inspired by a historical event in Georgia that has become a part of African American folklore of flying Africans. In 1803, a slave ship landed on the coast of Georgia in St. Simons Island with captive Africans from Nigeria with a cargo of Igbo people. Some of the Igbo people chose suicide than a life time of slavery by walking into the swamp and drowning. This location became known as Igbo landing in Georgia. According to African American folklore, the Igbos that committed suicide their souls flew back to Africa.

An African-American pre-med student at James Madison University wrote a teen novel published in 2021 titled, Me(Moth) is about an African-American youth named Moth whose grandmother is a Hoodoo practitioner. In the book, Moth is in search of her cultural roots after several deaths in her family.

Neo- Hoodoo

Coined by Ismael Reed in 1970, it celebrates the practices of rituals, folklore, and spirituality in the Americas beyond Christianity and religion. "Neo-Hoodoo believes that every man is an artist a priest. You can bring your own creative ideas to Neo-Hoodoo" Neo-Hoodoo celebrates Hoodoo in a way that is fully expressed by Black practitioners. It is often toned as "...terms that respect the syncretism of Voudon-based religion systems" It can be seen in many ways as a way of doing things it provides.."the Black Artist with vechile to merge art with politics without compromising either." Neo Hoodoo is a behavior of that gives "'...non-Western voices which express life and creativity ' intrude on or break the 'controlling patterns' of the 'dominant culture'". This is a radical form of Black writing which inspires resistance in the literary world.

The portrait "A Portrait of the Artist as a Shadow of His Former Self" by Kerry James Marshall is compared to Ishmael Reed's Neo-Hoodoo concept of balancing invisibility as visual. As the painter describes his work ethic for the painting to.."bring that figure close to being a stereotypical representation without collapsing completely into stereotype." The postcolonial theory of Hoodoo and the fact that Hoodoo is neo-African there is still assumption that it is uncivilized. Reed's Hoodoo aesthetic celebrates syncretism as a religious cultural practice countering Western Civilization desire to universalize itself through Christianity.

Slave narratives
In the 1930s, the Federal Writers' Project part of the Works Progress Administration during the Great Depression, provided jobs for unemployed writers to write and collect the experiences of former slaves. Writers, black and white, documented the experiences of the last generation of African Americans born into slavery. Former African American slaves told writers about their slave experience which provided readers a glimpse into the lives of the enslaved. Slave narratives revealed the culture of African Americans during slavery. African American former slaves talked about conjure, rootwork, and Hoodoo. Former slaves talked about healing with herbs, removing curses using Hoodoo, talking to spirits, using graveyard dirt to curse people, divination with cards and a walking boy, Hoodoo in Black churches, hiding conjure practices from their enslavers, cursing their slaveholders using Hoodoo, animal sacrifice, and other conjure practices. Some of the African American former slaves told writers what region of Africa their family is from. These regions were the Kongo or regions in West Africa. Former slaves talked about their families culture came from a family member from Africa. Slave narratives are good sources to know how slavery impacted the lives of African Americans, and how Hoodoo was used by the enslaved to free themselves. The Library of Congress has 2,300 first-person accounts from former slaves in their digital archive.

In slave narratives, African Americans revealed some of them were kidnapped directly from Africa and brought to America. These slave narratives coincide with the illegal slave trade. In 1807, the 9th United States Congress passed an act that prohibited the importation of slaves from Africa. However, this act did not stop illegal smuggling of enslaved Africans to the United States. The illegal slave trade continued into the 1860s, and sometimes resulted in a re-Africanization of African American culture with the importation of new Africans to the United States. Some of these illegal slave trades were documented in American history. For example, the slave ship the Wanderer landed in Jekyll Island, Georgia in 1858 with a cargo of 409 Africans. The Wanderer departed near the Congo River in Central Africa. In the 1930s, a local chapter of the Federal Writers' Project in Savannah, Georgia called the Georgia Writers' Project interviewed former slaves and descendants of former slaves who either came directly from Africa on the slave ship the Wanderer or a family member came from Africa on the Wanderer and published their findings in a book called, "Drums and Shadows Survival Studies Among the Georgia Coastal Negroes." The Georgia Writers' Project documented Hoodoo and conjure practices among African Americans in Georgia and traced the practices to West Africa and the Kongo region as some African Americans know what region in Africa a family member is from. One woman interviewed in St. Simons, Georgia said her father came from Africa on the slave ship the Wanderer. She thinks her father was Igbo and he talked about his life in Africa and the culture there and how it survived in her family. Other African Americans interviewed talked about the origins of their conjure practices came from the Ewe and Kongo people. For example, in West Africa graveyard dirt is placed inside conjure bags for protection against Juju. The West African practice of using graveyard dirt continues in the United States in black communities today in the African American tradition of Hoodoo.

Africatown located north of Mobile, Alabama is another example of the illegal slave trade and African culture in the United States. In 2012, Africatown was placed on the National Register of Historic Places for its significance in African American history. On July 8, 1860, the slave ship Clotilda was the last slave ship to transport Africans to the United States. The Clotilda entered the Mississippi Sound in Alabama with 110 Africans. The Africans imported to Alabama illegally came from West Africa, and the ethnic groups coming from the region were Atakora, Ewe, Fon, and Yoruba . Each group brought their religions and languages. Some in the group practiced West African Vodun, Islam, and the Yoruba religion. Mobile, Alabama became the home for these diverse Africans where their religious and spiritual practices blended with Christianity. After the Civil War, a group of 32 Africans founded their own community calling it Africatown. In their community, they practiced African burial practices of their dead. African names were given to their children so they will know what region in Africa their ancestry is from. Zora Neale Hurston wrote a book about Africatown called, Barracoon: The Story of the Last "Black Cargo". Hurston interviewed Cudjoe Lewis one of the founders of Africatown and one of few who survived the last Middle Passage to the United States.

Scholars estimate about 250,000 enslaved Africans were brought to the United States illegally between 1808 and 1859. This resulted in the further Africanization of African American spirituality in the coastal regions of the Southeast, because many of the North American slave ships landed in the coastal areas in the South.

Hoodoo in blues music

Several African American blues singers and musicians composed songs about the culture of Hoodoo, including W.C. Handy, Bessie Smith, Robert Johnson, Big Lucky Carter, and Al Williams. African American blues performers were influenced by the culture of Hoodoo and wrote songs about mojo bags, love workings, and spirits. Their songs brought awareness of Hoodoo practices to the American mainstream population.

Several blues songs describe love charms or other folk magic. In her "Louisiana Hoodoo Blues" Gertrude Ma Rainey sang about a Hoodoo work to keep a man faithful: ""Take some of you hair, boil it in a pot, Take some of your clothes, tie them in a knot, Put them in a snuff can, bury them under the step…." Bessie Smith's song "Red Mountain Blues" tells of a fortune teller who recommends that a woman get some snakeroot and a High John the Conqueror root, chew them, place them in her boot and pocket to make her man love her. Several other Bessie Smith songs also mention Hoodoo. The song "Got My Mojo Working," written by Preston "Red" Foster in 1956 and popularized by Muddy Waters throughout his career, addresses a woman who is able to resist the power of the singer's Hoodoo amulets.

Hoodoo practitioner Aunt Caroline Dye was born enslaved in Spartanburg, South Carolina and sold to Arkansas as a child, where she became known for psychic readings and divination with playing cards. She is mentioned by name in the Memphis Jug Band's "Aunt Caroline Dye Blues" (1930) and in Johnny Temple's song "Hoodoo Woman" (1937).

Blues singer Robert Johnson is known for his song about going "down to the crossroads" to sell his soul to the devil to become a better musician. Some authors suggest that the song invokes a Hoodoo belief in crossroads spirits, a belief that originated in Central Africa among the Kongo people. However, the devil figure in Johnson's song, a black man with a cane who haunts crossroads, closely resembles Papa Legba, a spirit associated with Louisiana Voodoo and Haitian Vodou.

Traditional Hoodoo vs. "marketeered" hoodoo

The culture of Hoodoo was created by African Americans. There are regional styles to this tradition, and as African Americans traveled the tradition of Hoodoo changes according to African Americans' environment. Hoodoo includes reverence to ancestral spirits, African-American quilt making, animal sacrifice, herbal healing, Bakongo and Igbo burial practices, Holy Ghost shouting, praise houses, snake reverence, African American churches, spirit possession, nkisi and minkisi practices, Black Spiritual churches, Black theology, the ring shout, the Kongo cosmogram, Simbi nature spirits, graveyard conjure, the crossroads spirit, making conjure canes, incorporating animal parts, pouring of libations, Bible conjure, and conjuring in the African American tradition. By the twentieth century, white drugstore owners and mail-order companies owned by white Americans changed the culture of hoodoo. The hoodoo that is practiced outside the African American community is not the hoodoo that was created by African Americans. It is called "marketeered" hoodoo. Other words for marketeered hoodoo are commercialized or tourist hoodoo. Hoodoo was modified by white merchants and replaced with fabricated practices and tools while some of the hoodoo practices by African Americans in the twentieth century into the present day went underground. Marketeered hoodoo spread further outside the African American community into other communities when hoodoo was marketed on the internet. There are a plethora of videos on the internet of people fabricating spells calling them hoodoo and others claiming to be experts on hoodoo and offering paid classes and writing books. As a result, people outside of the African American community think that marketeered hoodoo is authentic Hoodoo. Scholars are concerned about the number of people who are not from the African American community writing books on Hoodoo, because they have reduced Hoodoo to just spells and tricks. That Hoodoo is all about how to hex people and cast candle spells for love and money. This portrays hoodoo negatively, and turned it materialistic. For example, High John the Conqueror in African American folk stories is a black man from Africa enslaved in the United States whose spirit resides in a root that is used in Hoodoo. White American drugstore owners replaced conjure doctors in African American communities, and began putting an image of a white man on their High John the Conqueror product labels. As a result, some people do not know the African American folk hero High John the Conqueror is a black man.

This is problematic, because it takes away from the voices of African Americans, and makes white spiritual merchants the authority on hoodoo. The Hoodoo that is practiced by African Americans is defined by scholars as "Old Black Belt Hoodoo." Traditional hoodoo of African American people went into hiding by the twentieth century into the present day. There is a spiritual philosophy in Hoodoo, and the tradition does have its own theology that is missing which was taken out by the spiritual merchants who wanted to profit from an African American spiritual tradition. Charlatans used Hoodoo to make money, and changed the tradition as a form of selfish magic that is all about spells for love, money, and hexes in order to sale candles, oils, and trinkets. This kind of Hoodoo presented by charlatans not from the black community is the hoodoo that most people know. The Spiritual church, the Sanctified church, and praise houses in black communities is where traditional Hoodoo continues to be practiced by African Americans. One scholar traced manufactured hoodoo to the Great Migration of African-Americans from the South to the North. African-American folk magic changed in urban northern areas as African Americans did not have access to fresh herbs and roots from their backyards or neighborhoods as some bought their supplies from stores that profited from African-American folk practices. White merchants profited from African-American folk magic and placed stereotypical images of Indians onto hoodoo product labels to sell merchandise that appeared mystical, exotic, and powerful.

According to some scholars, the research and understanding of African-American Hoodoo should be examined from the Black American experience, and not from the interpretation of marketeers and exploiters that is found in books and online published by people who are not African American. White Americans want to appropriate Black culture and claim it as their own for profit. With the advent of the internet, African-American music and culture has become consumed more rapidly around the world on a daily basis. The internet resulted in the mass consumption and appropriation and sometimes mocking of black culture by whites and non-blacks in social media.

As one scholar explained, "The cultural	marketplace	of items and ideas has handled the faith and practice of hoodoo	roughly. Instead of being viewed as a legitimate religion, it is perceived as a system of magic rife with effeminate witchdoctors, pin cushioned voodoo	dolls,	and miscellaneous artifacts	that can be	bought and sold." The appropriation of hoodoo is based on ignorance about African-American cultural history and hoodoo's ties to black people. According to an interview from Florida International University, Hoodoo is predominantly practiced by people who are descendants of enslaved African Americans in the United States, and is a closed practice only for Black people because of Hoodoo's cultural ties to African-American heritage.

See also
 
 Black Seeds: The History of Africans in America

References

External links 
 Hoodoo in America
 West Tennessee Museum of Southern Hoodoo History
 Memphis Hoodoo & St. Paul’s Spiritual Holy Temple
 
 Ginseng, Hoodoo, and the Magic of Upholding African American Earth-Based Traditions
 Hoodoo, Conjure, and Rootwork
 Black women embrace the spiritual realm
 Haints & Gullah Ghost Palmetto Scene

 

 

 

 
African-American cultural history
African Americans and religion
Articles containing video clips
Christianity and religious syncretism
Folk religion
Folklore of the Southern United States
Religion in the Southern United States
Supernatural legends
Congolese-American history